In 2019, the main athletic events were the 2019 IAAF World Cross Country Championships, the 2019 IAAF World Relays, and the 2019 World Athletics Championships.

Major championships

World

World Championships
World Cross Country Championships
World Relays
World Mountain Running Championships
World Long Distance Mountain Running Championships
World Masters Indoor Championships
World Para Championships
IAU 50 km World Championships
IAU 24 Hour World Championships
IAU Trail World Championships
Universiade
World Police and Fire Games

Regional

African Games
African U20 Championships
Arab Championships
Asian Championships
Asian Marathon Championships
Asian Race Walking Championships
Asian Youth Championships
Southeast Asian Games
South Asian Games
East Asian Youth Games (cancelled)
European Games
European Athletics U23 Championships
European Athletics U20 Championships
European Cross Country Championships
European Combined Events Team Championships
European Throwing Cup
European Cup 10,000m
European Indoor Championships
European Mountain Running Championships
European Race Walking Cup
European Team Championships
Balkan Championships
Games of the Small States of Europe
European Youth Olympic Festival
Island Games
CARIFTA Games
NACAC Combined Events Championships
NACAC Cross Country Championships
NACAC Race Walking Championships
NACAC U18 & U23 Championships
NACAC U20 Championships
Pan American Games
Pan American U20 Championships
Pan American Race Walking Cup
South American Championships
South American Cross Country Championships
South American Half Marathon Championships
South American U20 Championships
South American Marathon Championships
South American Mountain Running Championships
South American Road Mile Championships
South American Trail Championships

World and continental athletics events
 March 30: 2019 IAAF World Cross Country Championships in  Aarhus
  won both the gold and overall medal tallies.
 April 21 – 24: 2019 Asian Athletics Championships in  Doha
  won the gold medal tally.  won the overall medal tally.
 May 11 & 12: 2019 IAAF World Relays in  Yokohama
 Final Rankings: 1. The , 2. , 3. , 4. , 5. 
 May 24 – 26: 2019 South American Championships in Athletics in  Lima
  won both the gold and overall medal tallies.
 June 25 – 28: 2019 Oceania Athletics Championships in  Townsville
  won both the gold and overall medal tallies.
 September 27 – October 6: 2019 World Athletics Championships in  Doha
 The  won both the gold and overall medal tallies.

World records

Indoor

Outdoor

Competition winners

2019 World Marathon Majors
 March 3:  2019 Tokyo Marathon
 Winners:  Birhanu Legese (m) /  Ruti Aga (f)
 April 15:  2019 Boston Marathon
 Winners:  Lawrence Cherono (m) /  Worknesh Degefa (f)
 April 28:  2019 London Marathon
 Winners:  Eliud Kipchoge (m) /  Brigid Kosgei (f)
 September 29:  2019 Berlin Marathon
 Winners:  Kenenisa Bekele (m) /  Ashete Bekere (f)
 October 13:  2019 Chicago Marathon
 Winners:  Lawrence Cherono (m) /  Brigid Kosgei (f) (World Record)
 November 3:  2019 New York City Marathon
 Winners:  Geoffrey Kamworor (m) /  Joyciline Jepkosgei (f)

2019 IAAF Diamond League
 May 3: Doha Diamond League in 

 200 m winners:  Ramil Guliyev (m) /  Dina Asher-Smith (f)
 800 m winners:  Nijel Amos (m) /  Caster Semenya (f)
 Men's 1500 m winner:  Elijah Manangoi
 Men's 3000 m Steeplechase winner:  Soufiane El Bakkali
 Men's Pole Vault winner:  Sam Kendricks
 Men's Shot Put winner:  Ryan Crouser
 Men's Discus Throw winner:  Daniel Ståhl

 Women's 3000 m winner:  Hellen Obiri
 Women's 100 m Hurdles winner:  Danielle Williams
 Women's 400 m Hurdles winner:  Dalilah Muhammad
 Women's High Jump winner:  Yaroslava Mahuchikh
 Women's Long Jump winner:  Caterine Ibargüen

 100 m winners:  Noah Lyles (m) /  Aleia Hobbs (f)
 400 m winners:  Fred Kerley (m) /  Salwa Eid Naser (f)
 Javelin Throw winners:  Andreas Hofmann (m) /  Lü Huihui (f)
 Men's 110 m Hurdles winner:  Omar McLeod
 Men's 400 m Hurdles winner:  Abderrahman Samba
 Men's 5000 m winner:  Yomif Kejelcha
 Men's High Jump winner:  Wang Yu
 Men's Long Jump winner:  Tajay Gayle

 Women's 1500 m winner:  Rababe Arafi
 Women's 3000 m Steeplechase winner:  Beatrice Chepkoech
 Women's Pole Vault winner:  Katerina Stefanidi
 Women's Shot Put winner:  Chase Ealey

 May 30: Bauhaus-Galan in  Stockholm (Note: Six events does not count for points & prize money here.)

 200 m winners:  Aaron Brown (m) /  Dina Asher-Smith (f)
 Discus Throw winners:  Daniel Ståhl (m) /  Denia Caballero (f)
 Men's 400 m winner:  Michael Norman
 Men's 1500 m winner:  Timothy Cheruiyot
 Men's 400 m Hurdles winner:  Karsten Warholm
 Men's Pole Vault winner:  Sam Kendricks
 Men's Long Jump winner:  Thobias Montler

 Women's 800 m winner:  Ajeé Wilson
 Women's 5000 m winner:  Agnes Jebet Tirop
 Women's 100 m Hurdles winner:  Kendra Harrison
 Women's High Jump winner:  Mariya Lasitskene

 June 6: Golden Gala Pietro Mennea in  Rome (Note: Two events does not count for points & prize money here.)

 Men's 200 m winner:  Michael Norman
 Men's 800 m winner:  Donavan Brazier
 Men's 5000 m winner:  Telahun Haile Bekele
 Men's 110 m Hurdles winner:  Sergey Shubenkov (Russia)
 Men's High Jump winner:  Bohdan Bondarenko
 Men's Triple Jump winner:  Omar Craddock
 Men's Shot Put winner:  Konrad Bukowiecki

 Women's 100 m winner:  Elaine Thompson
 Women's 400 m winner:  Salwa Eid Naser
 Women's 1500 m winner:  Genzebe Dibaba
 Women's 400 m Hurdles winner:  Dalilah Muhammad
 Women's Pole Vault winner:  Angelica Bengtsson
 Women's Long Jump winner:  Malaika Mihambo
 Women's Javelin Throw winner:  Lü Huihui

 June 13: Bislett Games in  Oslo (Note: Three events does not count for points & prize money here.)

 400 m Hurdles winners:  Karsten Warholm (m) /  Sydney McLaughlin (f)
 Men's 100 m winner:  Christian Coleman
 Men's 3000 m winner:  Selemon Barega
 Men's Dream Mile winner:  Marcin Lewandowski
 Men's Pole Vault winner:  Sam Kendricks
 Men's Javelin Throw winner:  Johannes Vetter

 Women's 200 m winner:  Dafne Schippers
 Women's 3000 m Steeplechase winner:  Norah Jeruto
 Women's 100 m Hurdles winner:  Christina Clemons
 Women's High Jump winner:  Mariya Lasitskene (Russia)
 Women's Triple Jump winner:  Caterine Ibargüen
 Women's Shot Put winner:  Gong Lijiao

 800 m winners:  Nijel Amos (m) /  Nelly Jepkosgei (f)
 Discus Throw winners:  Fedrick Dacres (m) /  Yaime Pérez (f)
 Men's 200 m winner:  Andre De Grasse
 Men's 3000 m Steeplechase winner:  Getnet Wale
 Men's 110 m Hurdles winner:  Sergey Shubenkov (Russia)
 Men's High Jump winner:  Bohdan Bondarenko
 Men's Long Jump winner:  Juan Miguel Echevarría

 Women's 100 m winner:  Blessing Okagbare
 Women's 400 m winner:  Salwa Eid Naser
 Women's 1500 m winner:  Genzebe Dibaba
 Women's Pole Vault winner:  Sandi Morris

 June 30: Prefontaine Classic in  Eugene (Note: Three events does not count for points & prize money here.)

 Shot Put winners:  Darlan Romani (m) /  Gong Lijiao (f)
 Men's 100 m winner:  Christian Coleman
 Men's 400 m winner:  Michael Norman
 Men's One Mile winner:  Timothy Cheruiyot
 Men's 110 m Hurdles winner:  Orlando Ortega
 Men's 400 m Hurdles winner:  Rai Benjamin
 Men's Pole Vault winner:  Armand Duplantis

 Women's 200 m winner:  Blessing Okagbare
 Women's 800 m winner:  Caster Semenya
 Women's 3000 m winner:  Sifan Hassan
 Women's 3000 m Steeplechase winner:  Beatrice Chepkoech
 Women's High Jump winner:  Mariya Lasitskene (Russia)

 July 5: Athletissima in  Lausanne (Note: Five events does not count for points & prize money here.)

 Men's 200 m winner:  Noah Lyles
 Men's 800 m winner:  Wycliffe Kinyamal
 Men's 1500 m winner:  Timothy Cheruiyot
 Men's 5000 m winner:  Yomif Kejelcha
 Men's 110 m Hurdles winner:  Orlando Ortega
 Men's Pole Vault winner:  Piotr Lisek
 Men's Long Jump winner:  Juan Miguel Echevarría

 Women's 100 m winner:  Shelly-Ann Fraser-Pryce
 Women's 400 m winner:  Salwa Eid Naser
 Women's 400 m Hurdles winner:  Shamier Little
 Women's High Jump winner:  Mariya Lasitskene (Russia)
 Women's Triple Jump winner:  Caterine Ibargüen
 Women's Shot Put winner:  Christina Schwanitz
 Women's Javelin Throw winner:  Christin Hussong

 July 12: Herculis in  Fontvieille (Note: Two events does not count for points & prize money here.)

 Triple Jump winners:  Christian Taylor (m) /  Yulimar Rojas (f)
 Men's 100 m winner:  Justin Gatlin
 Men's 400 m winner:  Steven Gardiner
 Men's 800 m winner:  Nijel Amos
 Men's 3000 m Steeplechase winner:  Soufiane El Bakkali
 Men's Pole Vault winner:  Piotr Lisek
 Men's Javelin Throw winner:  Andreas Hofmann

 Women's 200 m winner:  Shaunae Miller-Uibo
 Women's Mile winner:  Sifan Hassan
 Women's 100 m Hurdles winner:  Kendra Harrison
 Women's 400 m Hurdles winner:  Sydney McLaughlin
 Women's High Jump winner:  Mariya Lasitskene (Russia)

 July 20 & 21: Müller Anniversary Games in  London (Note: Eight events does not count for points & prize money here.)

 100 m winners:  Akani Simbine (m) /  Shelly-Ann Fraser-Pryce (f)
 400 m winners:  Akeem Bloomfield (m) /  Shericka Jackson (f)
 Men's 800 m winner:  Ferguson Cheruiyot Rotich
 Men's Triple Jump winner:  Pedro Pablo Pichardo
 Men's High Jump winner:  Majd Eddin Ghazal
 Men's Discus Throw winner:  Daniel Ståhl

 Women's 1500 m winner:  Laura Muir
 Women's 5000 m winner:  Hellen Obiri
 Women's 100 m Hurdles winner:  Danielle Williams
 Women's 400 m Hurdles winner:  Rushell Clayton
 Women's Pole Vault winner:  Anzhelika Sidorova (Russia)
 Women's Long Jump winner:  Malaika Mihambo
 Women's Javelin Throw winner:  Tatsiana Khaladovich

 Men's 100 m winner:  Yohan Blake
 Men's 400 m winner:  Akeem Bloomfield
 Men's 400 m Hurdles winner:  Yasmani Copello
 Men's High Jump winner:  Brandon Starc
 Men's Javelin Throw winner:  Cheng Chao-tsun

 Women's 200 m winner:  Shaunae Miller-Uibo
 Women's 800 m winner:  Ajeé Wilson
 Women's Mile winner:  Konstanze Klosterhalfen
 Women's 3000 m Steeplechase winner:  Beatrice Chepkoech
 Women's 100 m Hurdles winner:  Danielle Williams
 Women's Pole Vault winner:  Katerina Stefanidi
 Women's Long Jump winner:  Nafissatou Thiam
 Women's Discus Throw winner:  Yaime Pérez

 Triple Jump winners:  Will Claye (m) /  Yulimar Rojas (f)
 Men's 200 m winner:  Noah Lyles
 Men's 1500 m winner:  Ronald Musagala
 Men's 3000 m Steeplechase winner:  Soufiane El Bakkali
 Men's 110 m Hurdles winner:  Daniel Roberts
 Men's 400 m Hurdles winner:  Karsten Warholm
 Men's High Jump winner:  Michael Mason
 Men's Shot Put winner:  Tom Walsh

 Women's 100 m winner:  Elaine Thompson
 Women's 400 m winner:  Stephenie Ann McPherson
 Women's 800 m winner:  Hanna Green
 Women's Pole Vault winner:  Alysha Newman
 Women's Discus Throw winner:  Denia Caballero

 400 m Hurdles winners:  Karsten Warholm (m) /  Sydney McLaughlin (f)
 Javelin Throw winners:  Magnus Kirt (m) /  Lü Huihui (f)
 Men's 100 m winner:  Noah Lyles
 Men's 800 m winner:  Donavan Brazier
 Men's 5000 m winner:  Joshua Cheptegei
 Men's High Jump winner:  Andriy Protsenko
 Men's Pole Vault winner:  Sam Kendricks
 Men's Long Jump winner:  Juan Miguel Echevarría

 Women's 200 m winner:  Shaunae Miller-Uibo
 Women's 400 m winner:  Salwa Eid Naser
 Women's 1500 m winner:  Sifan Hassan
 Women's 3000 m Steeplechase winner:  Beatrice Chepkoech
 Women's Triple Jump winner:  Shanieka Ricketts
 Women's Shot Put winner:  Gong Lijiao

 September 6: Memorial Van Damme (final) in  Brussels (Note: Two events does not count for points & prize money here.)

 Discus Throw winners:  Daniel Ståhl (m) /  Yaime Pérez (f)
 Men's 200 m winner:  Noah Lyles
 Men's 400 m winner:  Michael Norman
 Men's 1500 m winner:  Timothy Cheruiyot
 Men's 3000 m Steeplechase winner:  Getnet Wale
 Men's 110 m Hurdles winner:  Orlando Ortega
 Men's Triple Jump winner:  Christian Taylor
 Men's Shot Put winner:  Tom Walsh

 Women's 100 m winner:  Dina Asher-Smith
 Women's 800 m winner:  Ajeé Wilson
 Women's 5000 m winner:  Sifan Hassan
 Women's 100 m Hurdles winner:  Danielle Williams
 Women's High Jump winner:  Mariya Lasitskene (Russia)
 Women's Pole Vault winner:  Katerina Stefanidi
 Women's Long Jump winner:  Malaika Mihambo

2019 IAAF World Challenge & IAAF Hammer Throw Challenge
 April 28: Grande Premio Brasil Caixa de Atletismo in  Bragança Paulista

 400 m Hurdles winners:  Alison dos Santos (m) /  Nikita Tracey (f)
 Shot Put winners:  Chukwuebuka Enekwechi (m) /  Jessica Ramsey (f)
 Men's 200 m winner:  Bernardo Baloyes
 Men's 800 m winner:  Alfred Kipketer
 Men's 1500 m winner:  Michael Kibet
 Men's 110 m Hurdles winner:  Gabriel Constantino
 Men's Pole Vault winner:  Augusto Dutra de Oliveira
 Men's Long Jump winner:  Emiliano Lasa
 Men's Hammer Throw winner:  Nick Miller

 Women's 400 m winner:  Maggie Barrie
 Women's 3000 m winner:  Daisy Jepkemei
 Women's 100 m Hurdles winner:  Andrea Carolina Vargas
 Women's Discus Throw winner:  Valarie Allman

 May 19: Golden Grand Prix in  Osaka

 100 m winners:  Justin Gatlin (m) /  Mikiah Brisco (f)
 200 m winners:  Michael Norman (m) /  Ivet Lalova-Collio (f)
 800 m winners:  Jonathan Kitilit (m) /  Noélie Yarigo (f)
 3000 m Steeplechase winners:  Philemon Kiplagat Ruto (m) /  Yukari Ishizawa (f)
 400 m Hurdles winners:  Masaki Toyoda (m) /  Dalilah Muhammad (f)
 Long Jump winners:  Natsuki Yamakawa (m) /  Brooke Stratton (f)
 Javelin Throw winners:  Edis Matusevičius (m) /  YU Yuzhen (f)
 Men's 400 m winner:  Vernon Norwood
 Men's 110 m Hurdles winner:  Shunsuke Izumiya
 Men's High Jump winner:  Naoto Tobe
 Men's Pole Vault winner:  Huang Bokai
 Men's Triple Jump winner:  Omar Craddock

 Women's 100 m Hurdles winner:  Sharika Nelvis
 Women's Hammer Throw winner:  Wang Zheng

 May 21: 2019 Nanjing World Challenge in 

 800 m winners:  Nijel Amos (m) /  Nelly Jepkosgei (f)
 Long Jump winners:  Tajay Gayle (m) /  Jazmin Sawyers (f)
 Men's 100 m winner:  Mike Rodgers
 Men's 3000 m Steeplechase winner:  Benjamin Kigen
 Men's 110 m Hurdles winner:  Orlando Ortega
 Men's 400 m Hurdles winner:  Takatoshi Abe
 Men's High Jump winner:  Wang Yu
 Men's Triple Jump winner:  Christian Taylor
 Men's Javelin Throw winner:  Thomas Röhler

 Women's 200 m winner:  Elaine Thompson
 Women's 1500 m winner:  Gudaf Tsegay
 Women's 100 m Hurdles winner:  Brianna Rollins-McNeal
 Women's Shot Put winner:  Gong Lijiao
 Women's Hammer Throw winner:  Wang Zheng

 June 9: Fanny Blankers-Koen Games in  Hengelo (World Challenge only)

 100 m winners:  Arthur Cissé (m) /  Dafne Schippers (f)
 5000 m winners:  Telahun Haile Bekele (m) /  Margaret Chelimo Kipkemboi (f)
 Men's 400 m winner:  Michael Cherry
 Men's 800 m winner:  Cornelius Tuwei
 Men's 110 m Hurdles winner:  Orlando Ortega
 Men's Pole Vault winner:  Sam Kendricks
 Men's Long Jump winner:  Luvo Manyonga

 Women's 100 m Hurdles winner:  Nia Ali
 Women's High Jump winner:  Erika Kinsey

 June 11: Paavo Nurmi Games in  Turku

 100 m winners:  Mike Rodgers (m) /  Crystal Emmanuel (f)
 Triple Jump winners:  Zhu Yaming (m) /  Gabriela Petrova (f)
 Men's 800 m winner:  Cornelius Tuwei
 Men's 3000 m Steeplechase winner:  Andrew Bayer
 Men's 110 m Hurdles winner:  Eduardo de Deus
 Men's Long Jump winner:  Zhang Yaoguang
 Men's Discus Throw winner:  Fedrick Dacres
 Men's Javelin Throw winner:  Magnus Kirt

 Women's 1500 m winner:  Winnie Nanyondo
 Women's 100 m Hurdles winner:  Christina Clemons
 Women's Pole Vault winner:  Alysha Newman
 Women's Shot Put winner:  Chase Ealey
 Women's Hammer Throw winner:  Anita Włodarczyk

 Men's Hammer Throw winner:  Wojciech Nowicki
 June 16: Janusz Kusociński Memorial in  Chorzów (Hammer Throw Challenge only)
 Men's Hammer Throw winner:  Paweł Fajdek
 June 20: Golden Spike Ostrava in the 

 Javelin Throw winners:  Magnus Kirt (m) /  Sara Kolak (f)
 Men's 100 m winner:  Mike Rodgers
 Men's 200 m winner:  Andre De Grasse
 Men's 400 m winner:  Steven Gardiner
 Men's 800 m winner:  Amel Tuka
 Men's One Mile winner:  Charlie Grice
 Men's Pole Vault winner:  Sam Kendricks
 Men's Long Jump winner:  Juan Miguel Echevarría
 Men's Shot Put winner:  Tom Walsh

 Women's 300 m winner:  Shaunae Miller-Uibo
 Women's 1500 m winner:  Gudaf Tsegay
 Women's High Jump winner:  Mariya Lasitskene
 Women's Hammer Throw winner:  Wang Zheng

 July 9: István Gyulai Memorial in  Székesfehérvár (Hammer Throw Challenge only)
 Men's Hammer Throw winner:  Paweł Fajdek
 August 27: Pál Németh Memorial in  Szombathely (Hammer Throw Challenge only)
 Hammer Throw winners:  Bence Halász (m) /  DeAnna Price (f)

 100 m winners:  Andre De Grasse (m) /  Ewa Swoboda (f)
 Men's 1500 m winner:  Joshua Thompson
 Men's 110 m Hurdles winner:  Omar McLeod
 Men's 400 m Hurdles winner:  Luke Campbell
 Men's High Jump winner:  Mateusz Przybylko
 Men's Pole Vault winner:  Armand Duplantis
 Men's Discus Throw winner:  Piotr Małachowski
 Men's Javelin Throw winner:  Johannes Vetter

 Women's 5000 m winner:  Daisy Jepkemei
 Women's 2000 m Steeplechase winner:  Gesa-Felicitas Krause
 Women's 100 m Hurdles winner:  Oluwatobiloba Amusan
 Women's Long Jump winner:  Malaika Mihambo
 Women's Triple Jump winner:  Shanieka Ricketts
 Women's Shot Put winner:  Brittany Crew

 Men's 100 m winner:  Mike Rodgers
 Men's 800 m winner:  Amel Tuka
 Men's 3000 m Steeplechase winner:  Matthew Hughes
 Men's 110 m Hurdles winner:  Shane Brathwaite
 Men's Long Jump winner:  Luvo Manyonga
 Men's Triple Jump winner:  Chris Benard
 Men's Shot Put winner:  Tom Walsh

 Women's 200 m winner:  Maja Mihalinec
 Women's 400 m winner:  Phyllis Francis
 Women's 1500 m winner:  Kate Grace
 Women's 100 m Hurdles winner:  Sharika Nelvis
 Women's Discus Throw winner:  Sandra Perković
 Women's Javelin Throw winner:  Sara Kolak

 September 27 – October 6: Part of the 2019 World Athletics Championships in  Doha (Hammer Throw Challenge only & final)
 Winners:  Paweł Fajdek (m) /  DeAnna Price (f)

2019 IAAF World Indoor Tour
 January 26: New Balance Indoor Grand Prix in  Boston

 300 m winners:  Rai Benjamin (m) /  Kendall Ellis (f)
 One Mile winners:  Yomif Kejelcha (m) /  Gabriela Stafford (f)
 Men's 400 m winner:  Nathan Strother
 Men's 800 m winner:  Donavan Brazier
 Men's 3000 m winner:  Hagos Gebrhiwet
 Men's 60 m Hurdles winner:  Jarret Eaton

 Women's 60 m winner:  Michelle-Lee Ahye
 Women's 500 m winner:  Sydney McLaughlin
 Women's 600 m winner:  Raevyn Rogers
 Women's 5000 m winner:  Konstanze Klosterhalfen
 Women's Pole Vault winner:  Katie Nageotte
 Women's Shot Put winner:  Magdalyn Ewen

 February 2: Weltklasse in Karlsruhe in 

 Men's 400 m winner:  Marc Koch
 Men's 800 m winner:  Andreas Kramer
 Men's 1500 m winner:  Vincent Kibet
 Men's High Jump winner:  Naoto Tobe
 Men's Long Jump winner:  Thobias Nilsson Montler

 Women's 60 m winner:  Ewa Swoboda
 Women's 3000 m winner:  Melissa Courtney
 Women's 60 m Hurdles winner:  Nadine Visser
 Women's Pole Vault winner:  Alysha Newman
 Women's Triple Jump winner:  Ana Peleteiro

 February 6: Copernicus Cup in  Toruń

 400 m winners:  Nathan Strother (m) /  Anna Kiełbasińska (f)
 800 m winners:  Erik Sowinski (m) /  Habitam Alemu (f)
 60 m Hurdles winners:  Orlando Ortega (m) /  Pamela Dutkiewicz (f)
 Men's 1500 m winner:  Samuel Tefera
 Men's High Jump winner:  Ilya Ivanyuk (Russia)
 Men's Pole Vault winner:  Sam Kendricks
 Men's Long Jump winner:  Juan Miguel Echevarría

 Women's 60 m winner:  Ewa Swoboda
 Women's Shot Put winner:  Christina Schwanitz

 February 8: Madrid Indoor Meeting in 

 60 m winners:  Mike Rodgers (m) /  Ewa Swoboda (f)
 1500 m winners:  Bethwell Birgen (m) /  Sofia Ennaoui (f)
 Men's 400 m winner:  Nathan Strother
 Men's 800 m winner:  Cornelius Tuwei
 Men's 60 m Hurdles winner:  Jarret Eaton
 Men's Long Jump winner:  Miltiadis Tentoglou
 Men's Shot Put winner:  David Storl

 Women's 3000 m winner:  Alemaz Samuel
 Women's Pole Vault winner:  Anzhelika Sidorova (Russia)
 Women's Triple Jump winner:  Yulimar Rojas

 February 16: Müller Indoor Grand Prix Birmingham in 

 60 m winners:  Su Bingtian (m) /  Elaine Thompson (f)
 400 m winners:  Nathan Strother (m) /  Stephenie Ann McPherson (f)
 800 m winners:  Joseph Deng (m) /  Shelayna Oskan-Clarke (f)
 60 m Hurdles winners:  Jarret Eaton (m) /  Evonne Britton (f)
 Long Jump winners:  Juan Miguel Echevarría (m) /  Ivana Španović (f)
 Men's 1500 m winner:  Samuel Tefera
 Men's High Jump winner:  Naoto Tobe

 Women's One Mile winner:  Laura Muir
 Women's 3000 m winner:  Alemaz Samuel
 Women's Pole Vault winner:  Holly Bradshaw

 February 20: PSD Bank Meeting (final) in  Düsseldorf

 60 m winners:  Su Bingtian (m) /  Marie-Josée Ta Lou (f)
 400 m winners:  Nathan Strother (m) /  Lena Naumann (f)
 800 m winners:  Álvaro de Arriba (m) /  Habitam Alemu (f)
 Men's 1500 m winner:  Jakob Ingebrigtsen
 Men's 60 m Hurdles winner:  Orlando Ortega
 Men's High Jump winner:  Naoto Tobe

 Women's Pole Vault winner:  Anzhelika Sidorova (Russia)
 Women's Triple Jump winner:  Yulimar Rojas
 Women's Shot Put winner:  Christina Schwanitz

2019 IAAF Combined Events Challenge
 April 27 & 28: Multistars in  Lana
 Decathlon winner:  Jan Doležal (8,117 points)
 Heptathlon winner:  Annie Kunz (5,971 points)
 May 25 & 26: Hypo-Meeting in  Götzis
 Decathlon winner:  Damian Warner (8,711 points)
 Heptathlon winner:  Katarina Johnson-Thompson (6,813 points)
 June 8 & 9: IX Meeting Internacional Arona 2019 in 
 Decathlon winner:  Martin Roe (8,037 points)
 Heptathlon winner:  Verena Preiner (6,472 points)
 June 22 & 23: Décastar in  Talence
 Decathlon winner:  Pierce Lepage (8,453 points)
 Heptathlon winner:  Nafissatou Thiam (6,819 points)
 June 29 & 30: Stadtwerke Ratingen Mehrkampf-Meeting in 
 Decathlon winner:  Kai Kazmirek (8,444 points)
 Heptathlon winner:  Verena Preiner (6,591 points)
 July 6 & 7: European Cup Combined Events – Super League in  Lutsk
 Decathlon winner:  Vital Zhuk (8,237 points)
 Heptathlon winner:  Daryna Sloboda (6,165 points)
 July 6 & 7: European Cup Combined Events – First & Second League in  Ribeira Brava, Madeira
 First League winners:  Jiří Sýkora (Decathlon -> 8,104 points) /  Kateřina Cachová (Heptathlon -> 6,034 points)
 Second League winners:  Niels Pittomvils (Decathlon -> 7,837 points) /  Noor Vidts (Heptathlon -> 6,027 points)
 League Team winners:  (40,519 points) (First League) /  (38,165 points) (Second League)
 July 25 – 28: Part of the 2019 USA Outdoor Track and Field Championships in  Des Moines, Iowa
 Decathlon winner:  Devon Williams (8,295 points)
 Heptathlon winner:  Erica Bougard (6,663 points)
 September 27 – October 6: Part of the 2019 World Championships in Athletics (final) in  Doha
 Decathlon winner:  Niklas Kaul (8,691 points)
 Heptathlon winner:  Katarina Johnson-Thompson (6,981 points)

2019 IAAF Cross Country Permit
 November 11, 2018: Cross de Atapuerca in  Burgos
 Winners:  Jacob Kiplimo (m) /  Senbere Teferi (f)
 November 18, 2018: Cross Internacional de Soria in  Soria
 Winners:  Jacob Kiplimo (m) /  Gloria Kite (f)
 November 25, 2018: Cross Internacional de la Constitución in  Alcobendas
 Winners:  Jacob Kiplimo (m) /  Eva Cherono (f)
 January 6: Campaccio in  San Giorgio su Legnano
 Winners:  Hagos Gebrhiwet (m) /  Yasemin Can (f)
 January 13: Cross Internacional Juan Muguerza in  Elgoibar
 Winners:  Rhonex Kipruto (m) /  Hellen Obiri (f)
 January 19: Northern Ireland International Cross Country in  Dundonald (Belfast)
 Winners:  Birhanu Balew (m) /  Meskerem Mamo (f)
 January 20: Cross Internacional de Itálica in  Seville
 Winners:  Jacob Kiplimo (m) /  Beatrice Chepkoech (f)
 January 27: Cinque Mulini in  San Vittore Olona
 Winners:  Jairus Birech (m) /  Winfred Mutile Yavi (f)
 February 3: Almond Blossom Cross Country (final) in  Albufeira
 Winners:  Jacob Kiplimo (m) /  Fancy Cherono (f)

2019 IAAF Race Walking Challenge
 February 10: Oceania Race Walking Championships (20 km) in  Adelaide
 20 km winners:  Perseus Karlström (m) /  Sandra Lorena Arenas (f)
 March 17: Asian Race Walking Championships (20 km) in  Nomi
 20 km winners:  Toshikazu Yamanishi (m) /  MA Zhenxia (f)
 April 6: Grande Prémio Internacional de Rio Maior em Marcha Atlética in  Rio Maior
 20 km winners:  Éider Arévalo (m) /  Qieyang Shenjie (f)
 April 20 & 21: IAAF Race Walking Challenge and Pan American 50 km Race Walking Cup in  Lázaro Cárdenas, Michoacán
 10 km (U20) winners:  Cesar Córdoba Fernandez (m) /  Glenda Morejón (f)
 20 km winners:  Perseus Karlström (m) /  Érica de Sena (f)
 50 km winners:  Isaac Palma (m) /  Evelyn Inga (f)
 May 11 & 12: 2019 IAAF Race Walking Challenge in  Taicang
 20 km winners:  Wang Kaihua (m) /  Qieyang Shenjie (f)
 May 19: 2019 European Race Walking Cup in  Alytus
 20 km winners:  Perseus Karlström (m) /  Živilė Vaiciukevičiūtė (f)
 50 km winners:  Yohann Diniz (m) /  Eleonora Giorgi (f)
 June 8: Gran Premio Cantones de La Coruña in  A Coruña
 20 km winners:  Toshikazu Yamanashi (m) /  Glenda Morejón (f)
 June 26: Oceania Race Walking Championships (10 km) in  Townsville
 10,000 m winners:  Rhydian Cowley (m) /  Jemima Montag (f)
 September 27 – October 6: Part of the 2019 World Championships in Athletics in  Doha
 20 km winners:  Toshikazu Yamanishi (m) /  Liu Hong (f)
 50 km winners:  Yusuke Suzuki (m) /  Liang Rui (f)
 October 20 – 22: Around Taihu International Race Walking 2019 (final) in  Suzhou
 20 km winners:  Perseus Karlström (m) /  Érica de Sena (f)

2019 IAAF Road Race Label Events (Gold)
 January 6: Xiamen International Marathon in 
 Winners:  Dejene Debela (m) /  Medina Deme Armino (f)
 January 20: Houston Half Marathon in the 
 Winners:  Shura Kitata Tola (m) /  Brigid Kosgei (f)
 January 20: Mumbai Marathon in 
 Winners:  Cosmas Lagat (m) /  Worknesh Alemu (f)
 January 25: Dubai Marathon in the 
 Winners:  Getaneh Molla (m) /  Ruth Chepngetich (f)
 Winner:  Fatuma Sado
 February 10: eDreams Mitja Marató de Barcelona in 
 Winners:  Eric Kiptanui (m) /  Roza Dereje (f)
 February 17: Hong Kong Marathon in 
 Winners:  Barnabas Kiptum (m) /  Volha Mazuronak (f)
 February 17: Seville Marathon in 
 Winners:  Ayana Tsedat (m) /  Guteni Shone (f)
 February 24: Medio Maratón Internacional Electrolit Guadalajara in 
 Winners:  Mathew Kisorio (m) /  Afera Godfay Berha (f)
 Winner:  Salah Eddine Bounasr
 March 10: Roma-Ostia Half Marathon in 
 Winners:  Guye Adola (m) /  Lonah Chemtai Salpeter (f)
 Winner:  Helalia Johannes
 March 17: Lisbon Half Marathon in 
 Winners:  Mosinet Geremew (m) /  Vivian Cheruiyot (f)
 March 17: Seoul International Marathon in 
 Winners:  Thomas Kiplagat Rono (m) /  Desi Jisa Mokonin (f)
 March 31: Chongqing International Marathon in 
 Winners:  Jimma Shambel (m) /  Aberu Mekuria (f)
 April 6: Prague Half Marathon in the 
 Winners:  Bernard Kimeli (m) /  Caroline Chepkoech Kipkirui (f)
 April 7: Istanbul Half Marathon in 
 Winners:  Benard Ngeno (m) /  Ruth Chepngetich (f)
 April 7: Rotterdam Marathon in the 
 Winners:  Marius Kipserem (m) /  Ashete Bekere (f)
 April 7: Vienna City Marathon in 
 Winners:  Vincent Kipchumba (m) /  Nancy Kiprop (f)
 April 14: Paris Marathon in 
 Winners:  Abrha Milaw (m) /  Gelete Burka (f)
 April 20: Yellow River Estuary International Marathon in 
 Winners:  Felix Kimutai (m) /  Afera Godfay (f)
 April 21: Yangzhou Jianzhen International Half Marathon in 
 Winners:  Berehanu Tsegu (m) /  Perine Nengampi (f)
 April 27: Madrid Marathon in 
 Winners:  Reuben Kerio (m) /  Shaso Insermu (f)
 April 28: Gifu Seiryu Half Marathon in 
 Winners:  Amos Kurgat (m) /  Ruth Chepngetich (f)
 May 5: Prague Marathon in the 
 Winners:  Almahjoub Dazza (m) /  Lonah Chemtai Salpeter (f)
 May 19: World 10K Bangalore in 
 Winners:  Andamlak Belihu (m) /  Agnes Jebet Tirop (f)
 May 19: Riga Marathon in 
 Winners:  Andualem Belay (m) /  Beyene Debele (f)
 May 25 & 26: Ottawa Race Weekend in 
 10 km winners:  Mohammed Ziani (m) /  Dorcas Kimeli (f)
 Marathon winners:  Albert Korir (m) /  Tigist Girma (f)
 June 2: Lanzhou International Marathon in 
 Winners:  Justus Kimutai (m) /  Worknesh Edesa (f)
 July 7: Gold Coast Marathon in 
 Winners:  Yuta Shitara (m) /  Rodah Chepkorir Tanui (f)
 July 28: Bogotá Half Marathon in 
 Winners:  Tamirat Tola (m) /  Ruth Chepngetich (f)
 August 25: Mexico City Marathon in 
 Winners:  Duncan Maiyo (m) /  Vivian Kiplagat (f)
 September 7: Prague Grand Prix in the 
 Winners:  Geoffrey Koech (m) /  Sheila Chepkirui (f)
 September 8: Taiyuan International Marathon in 
 Winners:  Marius Kimutai (m) /  Belainesh Yami Gurmu (f)
 September 15: Sydney Marathon in 
 Winners:  Felix Kiprotich (m) /  Stellah Barsosio (f)
 September 15: Copenhagen Half Marathon in 
 Winners:  Geoffrey Kipsang Kamworor (m) /  Birhane Dibaba (f)
 September 15: Cape Town Marathon in 
 Winners:  Edwin Koech (m) /  Celestine Chepchirchir (f)
 September 21: Ústí nad Labem Half Marathon in the 
 Winners:  Hendrik Pfeiffer (m) /  Jess Piasecki (f)
 September 22: Hengshui Lake International Marathon in 
 Winners:  Aychew Bantie (m) /  Marta Lema Megra (f)
 October 20: Amsterdam Marathon in the 
 Winners:  Vincent Kipchumba (m) /  Degitu Azmeraw (f)
 October 20: Luso Meia Maratona in 
 Winners:  Titus Ekiru (m) /  Peres Jepchirchir (f)
 October 20: Delhi Half Marathon in 
 Winners:  Andamlak Belihu (m) /  Tsehay Gemechu (f)
 October 20: Toronto Waterfront Marathon in 
 Winners:  Philemon Rono (m) /  Magdelyne Masai (f)
 October 27: Frankfurt Marathon in 
 Winners:  Fikre Tefera (m) /  Valary Aiyabei (f)
 October 27: Ljubljana Marathon in 
 Winners:  Kelkile Gezahegn (m) /  Bornes Chepkirui Kitur (f)
 October 27: Valencia Half Marathon in 
 Winners:  Yomif Kejelcha (m) /  Senbere Teferi (f)
 November 3: Istanbul Marathon in 
 Winners:  Daniel Kipkore Kibet (m) /  Hirut Tibebu (f)
 November 3: Hangzhou International Marathon in 
 Winners:  Marius Kimutai (m) /  Agnes Barsosio (f)
 November 3: Beijing Marathon in 
 Winners:  Mathew Kisorio (m) /  Sutume Asefa (f)
 November 17: Shanghai Marathon in 
 Winners:  Paul Lonyangata (m) /  Yebrgual Melese (f)
 November 30: Singapore Marathon in 
 Winners:  Joshua Kipkorir (m) /  Priscah Cherono (f)
 December 1: Valencia Marathon in 
 Winners:  Kinde Atanaw (ETH) (m) /  Roza Dereje (f)
 December 1: Fukuoka Marathon in 
 Winners:  El Mahjoub Dazza
 December 8: Guangzhou Marathon in 
 Winners:  Gebretsadik Abraha (m) /  Hiwot Gebrekidan Gebremarya (f)
 December 15: Shenzhen Marathon in 
 Winners:  Tadese Tola Woldegeberel (m) /  Belainesh Yami Gurmu (f)
 December 31: San Silvestre Vallecana in  Madrid

2019 IAAF Road Race Label Events (Silver)
 January 20: Houston Marathon in the 
 Winners:  Albert Korir (m) /  Biruktayit Degefa (f)
 February 3: Kagawa Marugame Half Marathon in 
 Winners:  Abdi Nageeye (m) /  Betsy Saina (f)
 March 17: New Taipei City Wan Jin Shi Marathon in 
 Winners:  Mathew Kipsaat (m) /  Naomi Jepkogei Maiyo (f)
 March 31: PZU Warsaw Half Marathon in 
 Winners:  Gilbert Masai (m) /  Gladys Kipkoech (f)
 April 7: Daegu Marathon in 
 Winners:  Felix Kipchirchir (m) /  Pamela Rotich (f)
 April 7: Hanover Marathon in 
 Winners:  Silas Mwetich (m) /  Racheal Mutgaa (f)
 April 7: Milano City Marathon in 
 Winners:  Titus Ekiru (m) /  Vivian Jerono Kiplagat (f)
 April 7: Rome Marathon in 
 Winners:  Tebalu Zawude (m) /  Megertu Alemu (f)
 April 14: Orlen Warsaw Marathon in 
 Winners:  Regasa Mindaye (m) /  Sheila Jerotich (f)
 May 12: Dalian International Marathon in 
 Winners:  Tsegaye Getachew (m) /  Mulu Seboka (f)
 May 25: Okpekpe Intn'l 10 km Road Race in 
 Winners:  Dawit Fikadu (m) /  Sheila Chelangat (f)
 September 15: Minsk Half Marathon in 
 Winners:  Berhane Afewerki (m) /  Nina Savina (f)
 September 22: Dam tot Damloop in the 
 Winners:  Solomon Berihu (m) /  Evaline Chirchir (f)
 October 6: Cardiff Half Marathon in 
 Winners:  Leonard Langat (m) /  Lucy Cheruiyot (f)
 October 6: Košice Peace Marathon in 
 Winners:  Hillary Kipsambu Kibiwott (m) /  Kumeshi Sichala (f)
 October 13: 20 Kilomètres de Paris in 
 Winners:  Enos Kales (m) /  Naomi Jebet (f)
 October 20: Lisbon Marathon in 
 Winners:  Andualem Shiferaw (m) /  Sechale Dalasa (f)
 November 10: Hefei International Marathon in 
 Winners:  Yihunilign Adana Amsalu (m) /  Ftaw Zeray Bezabh (f)
 December 1: 10K Valencia Trinidad Alfonso in 
 Winners:  Joshua Cheptegei (m) /  Linn Monica Nilsson (f)
 December 8: Saitama International Marathon in 
 Winners:  Peres Jepchirchir
 December 15: Bangsaen21 Half Marathon in  Chonburi Province
 Winners:  Sisay Lemma Kasaye (m) /  Shitaye Eshete Habtegebrel (f)
 December 15: Tata Steel Kolkata 25K in 
 Winners:  Leonard Barsoton (m) /  Guteni Shone (f)
 December 29: Corrida de Houilles in

2019 IAAF Road Race Label Events (Bronze)
 January 13: 10k Valencia Ibercaja in 
 Winners:  Chala Ketema Regasa (m) /  Tsehay Gemechu (f)
 February 2: Lagos City Marathon in 
 Winners:  Sintayehu Legese (m) /  Dinke Meseret (f)
 March 10: Barcelona Marathon in 
 Winners:  Alemu Bekele (m) /  Kuftu Tahir (f)
 March 17: Gdynia Half Marathon in 
 Winners:  Sondre Nordstad Moen (m) /  Genet Gashie (f)
 March 24: Beverly Wuxi Marathon in 
 Winners:  Asnake Dubre Negawo (m) /  Tsehay Gebre Getiso (f)
 April 7: Kyiv Half Marathon in 
 Winners:  Bernard Sang (m) /  Daisy Kimeli (f)
 April 7: Madrid Half Marathon in 
 Winners:  Kipkemoi Kiprono (m) /  Tigist Teshome (f)
 April 7: Pyongyang Marathon in 
 Winners:  RI Kang-bom (m) /  RI Kwang-ok (f)
 April 7: Maratona de São Paulo in 
 Winners:  Pharis Kimani (m) /  Sifan Melaku (f)
 April 14: Dongfeng Renault Wuhan Marathon in 
 Winners:  Andrew Ben Kimutai (m) /  Fantu Jimma (f)
 April 21: Nagano Olympic Commemorative Marathon in 
 Winners:  Jackson Kiprop (m) /  Meskerem Hunde (f)
 April 28: Cracovia Marathon in 
 Winners:  Cyprian Kimurgor Kotut (m) /  Viktoriya Khapilina (f)
 May 12: Geneva Marathon in 
 Winners:  Bernard Too (m) /  Josephine Chepkoech (f)
 May 19: Copenhagen Marathon in 
 Winners:  Jackson Limo (m) /  Etalemahu Habtewold (f)
 May 19: Cape Town Marathon in 
 Winners:  Morris Gachanga (m) /  Brillian Kipkoech (f)
 May 19: Happy 10K Guangzhou in 
 Winners:  Dawit Fikadu Admasu (m) /  Sandrafelis Chebet Tuei (f)
 June 8: 15K Nocturna Valencia Banco Mediolanum in 
 Winners:  Abel Kipchumba (m) /  Zeineba Yimer (f)
 June 15: Corrida de Langueux in 
 Winners:  Emmanuel Bor (m) /  Tesfaye Nigsti Haftu (f)
 June 22: Vidovdanska Trka 10 km in 
 Winners:  Afewerki Berhane (m) /  Karolina Jarzyńska (f)
 June 29: Le 10 km de Port-Gentil in 
 Winners:  Abdallah Mande (m) /  Sheila Chelangat (f)
 July 28: Liupanshui Summer International Marathon in 
 Winners:  Robert Kipkemboi (m) /  Eunice Chumba (f)
 August 4: Sunshine Coast Half Marathon in 
 Winners:  Kevin Batt (m) /  Lisa Jane Weightman (f)
 September 22: Porto Half Marathon in 
 Men's winners (tie):  Maxwell Kortek Rotich &  Enyew Mekonnen Alem
 Women's winner:  Antonina Kwambai
 September 22: Buenos Aires Marathon in 
 Winners:  Evans Chebet (m) /  Rodah Tanui (f)
 September 29: 20 km International de Marrakesh in 
 Winners:  Hamza Lemqartesse (m) /  Fatiha Asmid (f)
 October 6: Amgen Singelloop Breda in the 
 Winners:  Berhane Tesfay (m) /  Naom Jebet (f)
 October 13: Bucharest Marathon in 
 Winners:  Hosea Kipkemboi (m) /  Sophia Chesir (f)
 October 13: Wizz Air Sofia Marathon in 
 Winners:  Hosea Tuei (m) /  Hayelom Shegae (f)
 October 13: Changzhou West Taihu Lake Half Marathon in 
 Winners:  Taye Girma (m) /  Fantu Jimma (f)
 October 13: FNB Durban 10K CITYSURFRUN in 
 Winners:  Stephen Mokoka (m) /  Sheila Chepkirui (f)
 October 20: PKO Poznań Marathon in 
 Winners:  Cosmas Kyeva (m) /  Monica Stefanowicz (f)
 October 27: Changsha International Marathon in 
 Winners:  Abdi Kebede (m) /  Tigist Teshome (f)
 October 27: Venice Marathon in 
 Winners:  Tesfaye Lencho Anbesa (m) /  Judith Korir (f)
 November 1: La Corsa dei Santi 10 km in 
 Winners:  James Mburugu (m) /  Sofia Yaremchuk (f)
 November 3: Porto Marathon in 
 Winners:  Deso Gelmisa (m) /  Bontu Bekele Gada (f)
 November 3: Maratón Internacional Megacable Guadalajara in 
 Winners:  Kiprotich Kirui (m) /  Mamitu Daska Molisa (f)
 November 9: Xichang Qionghai Lake Wetland International Marathon in 
 Winners:  Shume Tafa (m) /  Aberash Demisse Korsa (f)
 November 10: Nanjing Marathon in 
 Winners:  Stephen Kiplimo (m) /  Melkam Gizaw Tola (f)
 November 10: Nanchang International Marathon in 
 Winners:  Moses Kiptoo Kurgat (m) /  Bayartsogt Munkhzaya (f)
 November 17: Kobe Marathon in 
 Winners:  Geofret Kusuro (m) /  Haruka Yamaguchi (f)
 November 17: Boulogne-Billancourt Half Marathon in 
 Winners:  Felix Kipkoec (m) /  Nancy Jelagat Meto (f)
 November 24: Florence Marathon in 
 Winners:  Nigussie Bekele Sahlesilassie (m) /  Jess Piasecki (f)
 December 1: Marathon COMAR de la ville de Tunis in 
 Winners:  Bernard Sang (m) /  Pauline Wangui (f)
 December 1: SCO Kunming International Marathon in 
 Winners:  Dereje Debele Tulu (m) /  Mulu Seboka Seyfu (f)
 December 1: GSEZ Marathon du Gabon in  Libreville
 Winners:  Alex Bartilol (m) /  Leah Jerotich (f)
 December 15: Taipei Marathon in 
 Winners:  Kenneth Mburu Mungara (m) /  Antonina Kwambai (f)
 December 15: Zurich Maratón Málaga in 
 Winners:  Martin Cheruiyot (m) /  Selamawit Getnet Tsegaw (f)
 December 31: Saint Silvester Road Race in  São Paulo
 December 31: BOclassic in  Bolzano

EA Major Competitions
 February 3: 2019 ECCC Cross Country in  Albufeira
 Individual winners:  Jacob Kiplimo (m) /  Fancy Cherono (f)
 Junior individual winners:  Edward Zakayo (m) /  Emine Akbingöl (f)
 Team winners:  Atletismo Bikila (m) /  Sporting CP (f)
 Junior Team winners  Darıca Belediyesi (m) /  Fenerbahçe (f)
 March 1 – 3: 2019 European Athletics Indoor Championships in  Glasgow
 60 m winners:  Ján Volko (m) /  Ewa Swoboda (f)
 400 m winners:  Karsten Warholm (m) /  Léa Sprunger (f)
 800 m winners:  Álvaro de Arriba (m) /  Shelayna Oskan-Clarke (f)
 1,500 m winners:  Marcin Lewandowski (m) /  Laura Muir (f)
 3,000 m winners:  Jakob Ingebrigtsen (m) /  Laura Muir (f)
 60 m Hirdles winners:  Milan Trajkovic (m) /  Nadine Visser (f)
 High Jump winners:  Gianmarco Tamberi (m) /  Mariya Lasitskene (f)
 Pole Vault winners:  Paweł Wojciechowski (m) /  Anzhelika Sidorova (f)
 Long Jump winners:  Miltiádis Tentóglou (m) /  Ivana Španović (f)
 Triple Jump winners:  Nazim Babayev (m) /  Ana Peleteiro (f)
 Shot Put winners:  Michał Haratyk (m) /  Radoslava Mavrodieva (f)
 4 × 400 m winners:  (Julien Watrin, Dylan Borlée, Jonathan Borlée, Kevin Borlée) (m) /  (Anna Kiełbasińska, Iga Baumgart-Witan, Małgorzata Hołub-Kowalik, Justyna Święty-Ersetic) (f)
 Men's Heptathlon winner:  Jorge Ureña
 Women's Pentathlon winner:  Katarina Johnson-Thompson
 March 9 & 10: 2019 European Throwing Cup in  Šamorín
 Shot Put winners:  Francisco Belo (m) /  Fanny Roos (f)
 U23 Shot Put winners:  Giorgi Mujaridze (m) /  Jorinde van Klinken (f)
 Discus Throw winners:  Philip Milanov (m) /  Shanice Craft (f)
 U23 Discus Throw winners:  Kristjan Čeh (m) /  Marija Tolj (f)
 Javelin Throw winners:  Matija Kranjc (m) /  Tatsiana Khaladovich (f)
 U23 Javelin Throw winners:  Aliaksei Katkavets (m) /  Sara Žabarino (f)
 Hammer Throw winners:  Quentin Bigot (m) /  Hanna Malyshchyk (f)
 U23 Hammer Throw winners:  Mykhaylo Kokhan (m) /  Sofiya Palkina (f)
 Teams winners:  (4246 p.) (m) /  (4276 p.) (f)
 U23 Teams winners:  (4363 p.) (m) /  (3648 p.) (f)
 May 25 & 26: 2019 ECCC Track and Field seniors— Group A in  Castellón
 Winners:  Club Atletismo Playas de Castellón (m) (122 p.) /  Enka SK (f) (133 p.)
 May 25: 2019 ECCC Track and Field seniors — Group B in  Tampere
 Winners:  RESC (m) (151 p.) /  Atletsko društvo Mass Ljubljana (f) (136 p.)
 July 6: 2019 European 10,000m Cup in  London
 July 7: 2019 European Mountain Running Championships in  Zermatt
 July 11 – 14: 2019 European Athletics U23 Championships in  Gävle
 July 18 – 21: 2019 European Athletics U20 Championships in  Borås
 August 9 – 11: 2019 European Team Championships — Super League in  Bydgoszcz
 August 9 – 11: 2019 European Team Championships — First League in  Sandnes
 August 10 & 11: 2019 European Team Championships — Second League in  Varaždin
 August 10 & 11: 2019 European Team Championships — Third League in  Skopje
 September 9 & 10:  –  match in  Minsk
 September 21: 2019 ECCC Track and Field U20 — Group A in TBD
 September 21: 2019 ECCC Track and Field U20 — Group B in  Leiria
 December 8: 2019 European Cross Country Championships in  Lisbon

ABAF competitions
 February 10: Balkan U20 Indoor Championships in  Istanbul
 60 m winners:  Vesselin Jivkov (m) /  Eden Finkelstein (f)
 400 m winners:  Yaroslav Demchenko (m) /  Mariana Shostak (f)
 800 m winners:  Jan Vukovič (m) /  Tugba Toptaş (f)
 1,500 m winners:  Andrii Krakovetskyi (m) /  Inci Kalkan (f)
 3,000 m winners:  Ayetullah Aslanhan (m) /  Urkış Işık (f)
 60 m Hurdles winners:  Filip Jakob Demšar (m) /  Krystyna Yurchuk (f)
 Long Jump winners:  Andriy Avramenko (m) /  Eden Finkelstein (f)
 Triple Jump winners:  Dimitrije Novakovic (m) /  Spyridoula Karydi (f)
 High Jump winners:  Oleh Doroshchuk (m) /  Rümeysa Öktem (f)
 Pole Vault winners:  Artur Bortnikov (m) /  Mesure Tutku Yilmaz (f)
 Shot Put winners:  Alperen Karahan (m) /  Pinar Akyol (f)
 4 × 400 m winners:  (m) /  (f)
 February 16: 2019 Balkan Athletics Indoor Championships in  Istanbul
 60 m winners:  Emre Zafer Barnes (m) /  Diana Vaisman (f)
 400 m winners:  Yavuz Can (m) /  Eleni Artymata (f)
 800 m winners:  Yevhen Hutsol (m) /  Jerneja Smonkar (f)
 1,500 m winners:  Elzan Bibić (m) /  Amela Terzić (f)
 3,000 m winners:  Mitko Tsenov (m) /  Luiza Gega (f)
 60 m Hurdles winners:  Mikdat Sevler (m) /  Şevval Ayaz (f)
 Long Jump winners:  Gabriel Bitan (m) /  Maryna Bekh (f)
 Triple Jump winners:  Levon Aghasyan (m) /  Anna Krasutska (f)
 High Jump winners:  Tihomir Ivanov (m) /  Daniela Stanciu (f)
 Pole Vault winners:  Lev Skorish (m) /  Eleni Pollak (f)
 Shot Put winners:  Mesud Pezer (m) /  Radoslava Mavrodieva (f)
 4 × 400 m winners:  (Mateo Parlov, David Salamon, Gabrijel Stojanović, Mateo Ružić) (m) /  (Kateryna Klymiuk, Tetyana Melnyk, Anastasiia Bryzgina, Hanna Ryzhykova) (f)
 April 7: 2019 Balkan Half Marathon Championships in  Kyiv
 Winners:  Roman Romanenko (m) /  Dariya Mikhaylova (f)
 Team winners: 
 April 20: 2019 Balkan Race Walking Championships in  Alexandroupolis
 20 km winners:  Alexandros Papamichail (m) /  Panayiota Tsinopoulou (f)
 U20 10 km winners:  Selman Ilhan (m) /  Evin Demir (f)
 U18 10 km winners:  Mustafa Tekdal (m) /  Songül Koçer (f)
 May 18: 2019 Balkan Mountain Running Championships in  Câmpulung Moldovenesc
 Senior 12 km winners:  Yüksel Gültekin (m) /  Mojca Koligar (f)
 U20 6 km winners:  Matur Yusuf (m) /  Öner Mihriban (f)
 U20 6 km Team winners:  (m) /  (f)
 Teams winners:  (m) /  (Eylem Gur, Mert Elif, Gülsün Tunc, Gulen Gul Betul) (f)
 June 22: Balkan 10k Road Race in  Brčko
 Winners:  Afewerki Berhane (m) /  Karolina Jarzyńska (f)
 July 2 & 3: 2019 Balkan U20 Championships in  Cluj-Napoca
 July 13: 2019 Balkan U18 Championships in  Kraljevo
 July 24 & 25: Balkan Relays in  Erzurum
 September 2 & 3: 2019 Balkan Athletics Championships in  Pravets
 November 3: 2019 Balkan Marathon Championships in  Belgrade
 November 9: 2019 Balkan Cross Country Championships in  Berane

2018–2019 EA Cross Country Permit Races
 September 29, 2018: #1 (TCS Lidingoloppet) in  Lidingö
 Winners:  Napoleon Solomon (m) /  Sylvia Mmboga Medugu (f)
 November 18, 2018: #2 (Cross de l'Acier) in  Leffrinckoucke
 Winners:  Berihu Solomon (m) /  Letesenbet Gidey (f)
 November 24, 2018: #3 (Skanderborg Cross) in  Skanderborg
 Winners:  Magnus Nyman Hall (m) /  Anna Emilie Møller (f)
 November 25, 2018: #4 (Darmstadt Cross) in  Darmstadt
 Winners:  Samuel Fitwi Sibhatu (m) /  Elena Burkard (f)
 November 25, 2018: #5 (International Warandecross) in  Tilburg
 Winners:  Michel Butter (m) /  Susan Krumins (f)
 December 2, 2018: #6 (Cross Internacional de la Constitución) in  Aranda de Duero
 Winners:  Tigist Gashaw (m) /  Gema Martín Borgas (f)
 January 6: #7 (Cross Zornotza) in  Amorebieta-Etxano
 Winners:  Stanley Waithaka (m) /  Trihas Gebre (f)
 January 12: #8 (Great Stirling Run) in  Stirling
 Winners:  Hillary Bor (m) /  Elena Burkard (f)
 January 20: #9 (Abdijcross) in  Kerkrade
 Winners:  Samuel Fitwi Sibhatu (m) /  Anna Gehring (f)
 January 20: #10 (Cross della Vallagarina) in  Rovereto
 Winners:  Telahun Haile Bekele (m) /  Moira Stewartová (f)
 January 20: #11 (Lotto Cross Cup) Hannut in  Hannut (final)
 Winners:  Thomas Ayeko (m) /  Anna Gosk (f)

EA Indoor Permit Meetings
 January 27: Meeting de Paris in  Paris
 60 m winners:  Arthur Cissé (m) /  Orlann Ombissa-Dzangue (f)
 60 m Hurdles winners:  Orlando Ortega (m) /  Andrea Ivančević (f)
 Men's Pole Vault winner:  Sam Kendricks
 Men's Triple Jump winner:  Hugues Fabrice Zango
 February 1: Meeting de l'Eure in  Val-de-Reuil
 60 m winners:  Mike Rodgers (m) /  Krystsina Tsimanouskaya (f)
 Women's 200 m winner:  Anne Maquet
 Men's 400 m winner:  Muhammad Abdalla Kounta
 800 m winners:  Cornelius Tuwei (m) /  Diribe Welteji (f)
 Men's 1,500 m winner:  Samir Dahmani
 60 m Hurdles winners:  Orlando Ortega (m) /  Evonne Britton (f)
 High Jump winners:  Ilya Ivanyuk (m) /  Tatiána Goúsin (f)
 Men's Triple Jump winner:  Simo Lipsanen
 February 2 & 3: European Athletics Permit Meeting Combined Events in  Tallinn
 Men's Heptathlon winner:  Janek Õiglane
 Women's Pentathlon winner:  Laura Ikauniece-Admidiņa
 February 3: Reykjavik International Games in  Reykjavík
 60 m winners:  Marcellus Moore (m) /  Finette Agyapong (f)
 400 m winners:  Ashton Allen (m) /  Thórdís Eva Steinsdóttir (f)
 800 m winners:  Sæmundur Ólafsson (m) (m) /  Shelayna Oskan-Clarke (f)
 Men's 1,500 m winner:  Hlynur Andrésson
 High Jump winners:  Benjamín Jóhann Johnsen (m) /  Ellen Huldén (f)
 Long Jump winners:  James Lelliott (m) /  Hafdís Sigurdardóttir (f)
 Shot Put winners:  Scott Lincoln (m) /  Irma Gunnarsdóttir (f)
 4 × 200 m winners:  (Marcellus Moore, Malcolm Johnson, Mordecai McDaniel, Ashton Allen) (m) /  (Melkorka Rán Hafliðadóttir, Gudbjörg Jóna Bjarnadóttir, Glódís Edda Þuríðardóttir) (f)
 February 4: Orlen Cup 2019 in  Łódź
 60 m winners:  Mike Rodgers (m) /  Ewa Swoboda (f)
 60 m Hurdles winners:  Orlando Ortega (m) /  Evonne Britton (f)
 Men's High Jump winner:  Sylwester Bednarek (m)
 Men's Pole Vault winner:  Piotr Lisek
 Shot Put winners:  Konrad Bukowiecki (m) /  Aliona Dubitskaya (f)
 February 4: Folksam GP Indoor Stockholm in  Stockholm
 60 m winners:  Confidence Lawson (m) /  Iréne Ekelund (f)
 Women's 400 m winner:  Gunta Vaičule
 800 m winners:  Andreas Kramer (m) /  Renée Eykens (f)
 Women's 1,500 winner:  Simona Vrzalová
 Men's 3000 m winner:  Stewart McSweyn
 Women's 60 m Hurdles winner:  Gréta Kerekes
 Women's Pole Vault winner:  Angelica Bengtsson
 Men's High Jump winner:  Jamal Wilson
 Long Jump winners:  Andreas Otterling (m) /  Khaddi Sagnia (f)
 Shot Put winners:  Mesud Pezer (m) /  Fanny Roos (f)
 February 9: Gugl Indoor Meeting in  Linz
 60 m winners:  D'Angelo Cherry (m) /  Alexandra Toth (f)
 400 m winners:  Tony van Diepen (m) /  Evelin Nádházy (f)
 Women's 60 m Hurdles winner:  Ivana Lončarek
 Women's 1,500 m winner:  Maruša Mišmaš
 Men's 3,000 m winner:  Mike Foppen
 Men's Pole Vault winner:  Mareks Ārents
 Men's Triple Jump winner:  Adrian Świderski
 Women's Long Jump winner:  Anasztázia Nguyen
 February 9: IFAM Meeting in  Ghent
 60 m winners:  Takuya Kawakami (m) /  Marije van Hunenstijn (f)
 400 m winners:  Austris Karpinskis (m) /  Camille Laus (f)
 800 m winners:  Aaron Botterman (m) /  Elena Bellò (f)
 1,500 m winners:  Nick Jensen (m) /  Elsbeth Ciesluk (f)
 Men's 3,000 m winner:  Hlynur Andrésson
 60 m Hurdles winners:  Michael Obasuyi (m) /  Nadine Visser (f)
 Men's High Jump winner:  Jamal Wilson
 Pole Vault winners:  Zhang Wei (m) /  Li Ling (f)
 Men's Long Jump winners:  Geovany Paz
 February 9: Banskobystrická latka 2019 in  Banská Bystrica
 High Jump winners:  Naoto Tobe (m) /  Mariya Lasitskene (f)
 February 10: International Indoor Meeting de Liévin in  Liévin
 60 m winners:  Arthur Cissé (m) /  Marie-Josée Ta Lou (f)
 400 m winners:  Kevin Borlée (m) /  Iga Baumgart-Witan (f)
 800 m winners:  Marcin Lewandowski (m) /  Habitam Alemu (f)
 Women's 1,000 m winner:  Genzebe Dibaba
 Men's 1,500 m winner:  Samuel Tefera
 Men's 2,000 m winner:  Birhanu Balew
 60 m Hurdles winners:  Pascal Martinot-Lagarde (m) /  Elvira Herman (f)
 Pole Vault winners:  Sam Kendricks (m) /  Katie Nageotte (f)
 Men's Triple Jump winner:  Hugues Fabrice Zango
 February 10: Meeting Metz Moselle Athlélor in  Metz
 60 m winners:  Emre Zafer Barnes (m) /  Mujinga Kambundji (f)
 Men's 200 m winner:  Bernardo Baloyes
 Women's 300 m winner:  Léa Sprunger
 800 m winners:  Clément Dhainaut (m) /  Lovisa Lindh (f)
 Men's 1,500 m winner:  Abderrahmane Anou
 Men's 3,000 m winner:  Stewart McSweyn
 60 m Hurdles winners:  Jarret Eaton (m) /  Nooralotta Neziri (f)
 Women's Long Jump winner:  Nastassia Mironchyk-Ivanova
 Men's Triple Jump winner:  Nazim Babayev
 February 12: Czech Indoor Gala in  Ostrava
 60 m winners:  Mike Rodgers (m) /  Inna Eftimova (f)
 300 m winners:  Pavel Maslák (m) /  Gunta Vaičule (f)
 800 m winners:  Amel Tuka (m) /  Alexandra Štuková (f)
 Women's 1,500 m winner:  Sofia Ennaoui
 Women's High Jump winner:  Yuliya Chumachenko
 Women's Pole Vault winner:  Amálie Švábíková
 Long Jump winners:  Shontaro Shiroyama (m) /  Anasztázia Nguyen (f)
 Men's Shot Put winner:  Tim Nedow
 Women's 4 × 400 m winners:  (Lada Vondrová, Tereza Petržilková, Marcela Pírková, Martina Hofmanová)
 February 13: AIT Grand Prix 2019 in  Athlone
 60 m winners:  Su Bingtian (m) /  Gayon Evans (f)
 400 m winners:  Tony van Diepen (m) /  Meghan Beesley (f)
 800 m winners:  Mark English (m) /  Claire Mooney (f)
 1,500 m winners:  Marcin Lewandowski (m) /  Ciara Mageean (f)
 Men's 60 m Hurdles winner:  David King
 Men's Pole Vault winner:  Tommi Holttinen
 Men's Long Jump winner:  Donal Kearns
 Women's High Jump winner:  Tatiána Goúsin
 February 17: Istanbul Indoor Cup in  Istanbul
 60 m winners:  D'Angelo Cherry (m) /  Inna Eftimova (f)
 400 m winners:  Vitaliy Butrym (m) /  Tetyana Melnyk (f)
 60 m Hurdles winners:  Vitali Parakhonka (m) /  Anamaria Nesteriuc (f)
 Women's 1,500 m winner:  Amela Terzić
 Men's 3,000 m winner:  Elzan Bibić
 Men's Long Jump winner:  Muammer Demir
 Men's High Jump winner:  Alperen Acet
 Shot Put winners:  Francisco Belo (m) /  Emel Dereli (f)
 February 20: Serbian Open Indoor Meeting in  Belgrade
 60 m winners:  Aykut Ay (m) /  Milana Tirnanić (f)
 400 m winners:  Amel Tuka (m) /  Anita Horvat (f)
 1,500 m winners:  Elzan Bibić (m) /  Amela Terzić (f)
 60 m Hurdles winners:  Luka Trgovčević (m) /  Ivana Lončarek (f)
 Long Jump winners:  Strahinja Jovančević (m) /  Ivana Španović (f)
 Men's High Jump winner:  Jasmin Halili
 Men's Shot Put winner:  Mesud Pezer
 February 24: All Star Perche in  Clermont-Ferrand (final)
 Pole Vault winners:  Piotr Lisek (m) /  Angelica Bengtsson (f)

EA Race Walking Permit Meetings
 March 23: Dudinská Päťdesiatka in  Dudince
 20 km winners:  Arturas Mastianica (m) /  Sandra Galvis (f)
 50 km winners:  Håvard Haukenes (m) /  Mária Czaková (f)
 U20 10 km winners:  Carlos Mercenario Jr. (m) /  Hana Burzalová (f)
 Men's U18 10 km winner:  Máté Ferenc Varga
 April 6: Podebrady Walking in  Poděbrady
 5 km winners:  Steffen Borsch (m) /  Bianca Schenker (f)
 20 km winners:  Vasiliy Mizinov (m) /  Eleonora Anna Giorgi (f)
 U20 10 km winners:  César Córdova Fernández (m) /  Karla Serrano (f)
 U18 10 km winners:  Patrik Nemčok (m) /  Mathilde Frenzl (f)
 April 13: Naumburg Race Walking in  Naumburg (final)
 20 km winners:  Nils Brembach (m) /  Marine Quennehen (f)
 U23 20 km winners:  Leo Köpp (m) /  Saskia Feige (f)
 Women's U18 winner:  Mathilde Frenzl

EA Outdoor Classic Meetings
 June 3: Memoriál Josefa Odložila in  Prague
 Men's 100 m winner:  Arthur Cissé
 Men's 400 m winner:  Baboloki Thebe
 Women's 800 m winner:  Malika Akkaoui
 Men's 1,500 m winner:  Hillary Ngetich
 Women's 100 m Hurdles winner:  Oluwatobiloba Amusan
 400 m Hurdles winners:  Abdelmalik Lahoulou (m) /  Zuzana Hejnová (f)
 Men's Pole Vault winner:  Axel Chapelle
 Men's Javelin Throw winner:  Jakub Vadlejch
 Women's High Jump winner:  Ana Šimić
 Men's Long Jump winner:  Radek Juška
 Men's Shot Put winner:  Joe Kovacs
 June 4: Clean Air Games in  Oslo
 Women's 200 m winner:  Semoy Hackett
 Men's 300 m winner:  Michael Berry
 800 m winners:  Žan Rudolf (m) /  Irene Baldessari (f)
 Men's 110 m Hurdles winner:  Koen Smet
 Women's 100 m Hurdles winner:  Jade Barber
 400 m Hurdles winners:  Johnny Dutch (m) /  Kaila Barber (f)
 Men's Long Jump winner:  Julian Howard
 Discus Throw winners:  Traves Smikle (m) /  Vanessa Kamga (f)
 Hammer Throw winners:  Bence Halász (m) /  Ida Storm (f)
 Pole Vault winners:  Eirik G. Dolve (m) /  *  (f)
 Men's Shot Put winner:  Martin Roe
 4 × 100 m winners:  (m) /  (f)
 June 9: Venizelia – Chania in  Chania
 100 m winners:  Richard Kilty (m) /  Remona Burchell (f)
 400 m winners:  Kyle Clemons (m) /  Maria Belimpasaki (f)
 800 m winners:  Balázs Vindics (m) /  Olha Lyakhova (f)
 Women's 100 m Hurdles winner:  Elisavet Pesiridou
 Long Jump winners:  Miltiadis Tentoglou (m) /  Quanesha Burks (f)
 Men's Hammer Throw winner:  Nick Miller
 Women's Javelin Throw winner:  Irena Šedivá
 Men's Shot Put winner:  Maksim Afonin
 June 11: Meeting de Montreuil in 
 100 m winners:  Yuki Koike (m) /  Carolle Zahi (f)
 400 m winners:  Vernon Norwood (m) /  Christine Botlogetswe (f)
 800 m winners:  Collins Kipruto (m) /  Laura Muir (f)
 Men's 110 m Hurdles winner:  Wilhem Belocian
 Women's 100 m Hurdles winner:  Kendell Williams
 Men's 400 m Hurdles winner:  Abdelmalik Lahoulou
 Men's 1500 m winner:  Ronald Musagala
 Women's 2000 m winner:  Caster Semenya
 Men's Triple Jump winner:  Christian Taylor
 Women's Hammer Throw winner:  Zalina Petrivskaya
 June 11–12: Irena Szewinska Memorial in  Bydgoszcz
 100 m winners:  Simon Magakwe (m) /  Morolake Akinosun (f)
 400 m winners:  Abbas Abubakar Abbas (m) /  Aminatou Seyni (f)
 Women's U20 400 m winner:  Susane Lächele
 800 m winners:  Adam Kszczot (m) /  Frewoni Hailu (f)
 Men's 110 m Hurdles winner:  Damian Czykier
 Women's 100 m Hurdles winner:  Luminosa Bogliolo
 Men's 3000 m Steeplechase winner:  Barnabas Kipyego
 Women's Long Jump winner:  Anasztázia Nguyen
 Men's Triple Jump winner:  Adrian Świderski
 Men's Hammer Throw winner:  Wojciech Nowicki
 Men's Pole Vault winner:  Paweł Wojciechowski
 Men's Shot Put winner:  Michał Haratyk
 June 15: AtletiCAGenève in  Geneva
 Note: Due to heavy thunderstorm, the meet had to be stopped at around 16h45. The following events did not finish: Men's High Jump, Men's 100 m (only 1 heat), Men's 110 m Hurdles (only heats), Women's Pole Vault, Women's 100 m Hurdles (only heats).
 Note: The following events have been canceled: Men's 200 m, Women's Triple Jump, Women's 200 m, Mixed 4 × 400 m.
 Women's 100 m winner:  Ajla Del Ponte
 400 m winners:  Davide Re (m) /  Déborah Sananes (f)
 Women's 800 m winner:  Mari Smith
 Men's 1500 m winner:  Simas Bertašius
 400 m Hurdles winners:  Sebastian Rodger (m) /  Femke Bol (f)
 High Jump winners:  Jossie Graumann (f)
 Long Jump winners:  Filippo Randazzo (m) /  LU Minja (f)
 Women's Discus Throw winner:  Amy Holder
 Men's Javeline Throw winner:  Norbert Rivasz-Tóth
 Men's Pole Vault winner:  Charlie Myers
 4 × 100 m winners:  (Chris Garia, Churandy Martina, Hensley Paulina, Taymir Burnet) (m) /  (Eefje Boons, Marije van Hunenstijn, Madiea Ghafoor, Naomi Sedney) (f)
 June 15: P-T-S Meeting in  Šamorín
 Men's 100 m winner:  Christopher Belcher
 Women's 400 m winner:  Maria Belimpasaki
 Women's 800 m winner:  Freweyni Hailu
 Women's 100 m Hurdles winner:  Hanna Plotitsyna
 400 m Hurdles winners:  Johnny Dutch (m) /  Kiah Seymour (f)
 Men's 1000 m winner:  Ayanleh Souleiman
 Women's 3000 m Race Walk winner:  Mária Czaková
 Men's 3000 m steeplechase winner:  Tafese Soboka
 Men's High Jump winner:  Majededdin Ghazal
 Women's Long Jump winner:  Kendell Williams
 Men's Triple Jump winner:  Christian Taylor
 Men's Javelin Throw winner:  Cyprian Mrzygłód
 June 16: 65. Janusz Kusociński Memorial in  Chorzów
 100 m winners:  Mike Rodgers (m) /  Ewa Swoboda (f)
 400 m winners:  Abbas Abubakar Abbas (m) /  Dalilah Muhammad (f)
 Men's 800 m winner:  Alfred Kipketer
 Women's 1500 m winner:  Daryia Barysevich
 Women's 100 m Hurdles winner:  Karolina Kołeczek
 Men's 110 m Hurdles winner:  Roger Iribarne
 Women's High Jump winner:  Mariya Lasitskene
 Men's Long Jump winner:  Tomasz Jaszczuk
 Hammer Throw winners:  Paweł Fajdek (m) /  Gwen Berry (f)
 Men's Pole Vault winner:  Sam Kendricks
 Shot Put winners:  Tom Walsh (m) /  Aliona Dubitskaya (f)
 June 18: Copenhagen Athletics Games in  Copenhagen
 100 m winners:  Sydney Siame (m) /  Rachel Miller (f)
 Men's 400 m winner:  Michael Berry
 Women's 1500 m winners:  Evans Kipchumba (m) /  Anna Emilie Møller (f)
 Men's 3000 m steeplechase winner:  Rantso Mokopane
 Men's 110 m Hurdles winner:  João Vítor de Oliveira
 Women's 100 m Hurdles winner:  Jade Barber
 400 m Hurdles winners:  Johnny Dutch (m) /  Zuzana Hejnová (f)
 Men's Long Jump winner:  Sreeshankar Murali
 Women's Triple Jump winner:  Thea LaFond
 Discus Throw winners:  Ola Stunes Isene (m) /  Kristin Pudenz (f)
 June 18: Sollentuna GP in  Sollentuna
 100 m winners:  Christopher Belcher (m) /  Crystal Emmanuel (f)
 400 m winners:  Rabah Yousif (m) /  Emily Diamond (f)
 800 m winners:  Abdessalem Ayouni (m) /  Lovisa Lindh (f)
 1500 m winners:  Andreas Almgren (m) /  P. U. Chitra (f)
 Men's 3000 m steeplechase winner:  Ben Buckingham
 5000 m winners:  Narve Gilje Nordås (m) /  Samrawit Mengsteab (f)
 Women's 100 m Hurdles winner:  Evonne Britton
 Men's 400 m Hurdles winner:  Jeffery Gibson
 High Jump winners:  Hsiang Chun-hsien (m) /  Nicola McDermott (f)
 Men's Long Jump winner:  Uladzilau Bulakhau
 Women's Javelin Throw winner:  Li Hui-jun
 Men's Discus Throw winner:  Daniel Ståhl
 Women's Pole Vault winner:  Angelica Bengtsson
 June 21: Meeting Iberoamericano de Atletismo in  Huelva
 400 m winners:  Anthony José Zambrano (m) /  Roxana Gómez (f)
 Men's 800 m winner:  Álvaro de Arriba
 400 m Hurdles winners:  Guillermo Ruggeri (m) /  Zurian Hechavarría (f)
 1500 m winners:  Adel Mechaal (m) /  Esther Chebet (f)
 3000 m steeplechase winners:  Yemane Haileselassie (m) /  Daisy Jepkemei (f)
 Men's 5000 m winner:  Tades Worku
 Women's 5000 m Race Walk winner:  Laura García-Caro
 Women's Discus Throw winner:  Denia Caballero
 Men's Hammer Throw winner:  Mihail Anastasakis
 Women's Triple Jump winner:  Yulimar Rojas
 June 22: Kuortane Meeting in  Kuortane
 Men's 100 m winner:  Samuel Osewa
 Women's 200 m winner:  Maggie Barrie
 Men's 800 m winner:  Joonas Rinne
 Women's 1500 m winner:  Sara Kuivisto
 Men's 3000 m Steeplechase winner:  Mohamed Tindouft
 Men's 110 m Hurdles winner:  David King
 Women's 100 m Hurdles winner:  Karolina Kołeczek
 Women's 400 m Hurdles winner:  Kiah Seymour
 Women's High Jump winner:  Ana Šimić
 Men's Triple Jump winner:  Nathan Douglas
 Men's Hammer Throw winner:  Nick Miller
 Javelin Throw winners:  Magnus Kirt (m) /  Liu Shiying (f)
 Women's Pole Vault winner:  Holly Bradshaw
 June 22: Meeting Stanislas in  Nancy
 100 m winners:  Bryce Robinson (m) /  Orlann Ombissa-Dzangue (f)
 Women's 400 m winner:  Aminatou Seyni
 800 m winners:  Alfred Kipketer (m) /  Winnie Nanyondo (f)
 Men's 1500 m winner:  Ronald Musagala
 Men's 110 m Hurdles winner:  Wilhem Belocian
 Women's 100 m Hurdles winner:  Luminosa Bogliolo
 Men's Long Jump winner:  Yann Randrianasolo
 Men's Discus Throw winner:  Robert Urbanek
 Men's Hammer Throw winner:  Paweł Fajdek
 Women's Pole Vault winner:  Xu Huiqin
 June 22: Soundtrack Meeting in  Tübingen
 Meeting cancelled
 June 30: Résisprint in  La Chaux-de-Fonds
 100 m winners:  Cejhae Greene (m) /  Tebogo Mamatu (f)
 200 m winners:  Alex Wilson (m) /  Lieke Klaver (f)
 400 m winners:  Anthony José Zambrano de la Cruz (m) /  Jodie Williams (f)
 800 m winners:  Enrico Parigi (m) /  Tsepang Sello (f)
 Men's 110 m Hurdles winner:  Eduardo de Deus
 Women's 100 m Hurdles winner:  Luminosa Bogliolo
 400 m Hurdles winners:  Alison Santos (m) /  Nikita Tracey (f)
 Women's Pole Vault winner:  Nicole Büchler
 Triple Jump winners:  Zhu Yaming (m) /  Diana Zagainova (f)
 Long Jump winners:  Zhang Yaoguang (m) /  Eliane Martins (f)
 High Jump winners:  Vivien Streit (m) /  Salome Lang (f)
 Javelin Throw winners:  Phil-Mar van Rensburg (m) /  Caroline Agnou (f)
 July 2: Meeting de Marseille in  Marseille
 Men's 100 m winner:  Jimmy Vicaut
 Women's 200 m winner:  Ashleigh Nelson
 Men's 400 m winner:  Tyrell Richard
 800 m winners:  Mostafa Smaili (m) /  Nelly Jepkosgei (f)
 1500 m winners:  Charlie Grice (m) /  Tigist Ketema (f)
 Women's 100 m Hurdles winner:  Solène Ndama
 Women's 400 m Hurdles winner:  Sydney McLaughlin
 Men's High Jump winner:  Luis Castro
 Women's Long Jump winner:  Kate Hall
 Men's Javelin Throw winner:  Cyprian Mrzygłód
 July 3: Karlstad GP in  Karlstad
 100 m winners:  Cejhae Greene (m) /  Natalliah Whyte (f)
 Men's 200 m winner:  Delano Williams
 800 m winners:  Peter Bol (m) /  Hedda Hynne (f)
 Men's 1500 m winner:  Vincent Keter
 Men's 110 m Hurdles winner:  Max Hrelja
 Women's 100 m Hurdles winner:  Maja Rogemyr
 400 m Hurdles winners:  Isak Andersson (m) /  Minna Svärd (f)
 High Jump winners:  Naoto Hasegawa (m) /  Marija Vuković (f)
 Pole Vault winners:  Melker Svärd Jacobsson (m) /  Maryna Kylypko (f)
 Long Jump winners:  Andreas Carlsson (m) /  Tilde Johansson (f)
 Shot Put winners:  Scott Lincoln (m) /  Brittany Crew
 Men's Discus Throw winner:  Daniel Ståhl
 Men's Javelin Throw winner:  Thomas Röhler
 July 16: Meeting Città di Padova in  Padua
 100 m winners:  Marcell Jacobs (m) /  Shelly-Ann Fraser-Pryce (f)
 Men's 200 m winner:  Aldemir da Silva Júnior
 400 m winners:  Emmanuele Bamidele (m) /  Phyllis Francis (f)
 Women's 800 m winner:  Eunice Sum
 Men's 110 m hurdles winner:  Freddie Crittenden
 Women's 100 m Hurdles winner:  Pedrya Seymour
 Men's 400 m Hurdles winner:  Byron Robinson
 Women's High Jump winner:  Mariya Lasitskene
 Men's Long Jump winner:  Trumaine Jefferson
 Women's Triple Jump winner:  Yulimar Rojas
 Men's Pole Vault winner:  Ernest Obiena
 Men's Shot Put winner:  O'Dayne Richards
 July 16: Meeting International de Sotteville-lès-Rouen in  Sotteville-lès-Rouen
 100 m winners:  Arthur Cissé (m) /  Carina Horn (f)
 Men's 200 m winner:  Christophe Lemaitre
 Women's 400 m winner:  Laviai Nielsen
 Men's 800 m winner:  Alfred Kipketer
 Women's 1500 m winner:  Quailyne Kiprop
 Men's 3000 m winner:  Abdalaati Iguider
 Men's 110 m Hurdles winner:  Yaqoub Al-Youha
 Women's 100 m Hurdles winner:  Tobi Amusan
 Men's High Jump winner:  Tihomir Ivanov
 Men's Triple Jump winner:  Alexsandro Melo
 Women's Discus Throw winner:  Yaimé Pérez
 Women's Javelin Throw winner:  Maria Andrejczyk
 Women's Pole Vault winner:  Yarisley Silva
 July 17: Meeting International de Liège in  Liège
 100 m winners:  Cejhae Greene (m) /  Michelle-Lee Ahye (f)
 Men's 300 m winner:  Clarence Munyai
 400 m winners:  Femi Ogunode (m) /  Tia-Adana Belle (f)
 800 m winners:  Tshepo Tshite (m) /  Emily Cherotich Tuei (f)
 1500 m winners:  Kazuto Iizawa (m) /  Selamawit Dagnachew (f)
 400 m Hurdles winners:  Mamadou Kassé Hanne (m) /  Ristananna Tracey (f)
 3000m Steeplechase winners:  Wilberforce Kones (m) /  Geneviève Lalonde (f)
 Men's 110 m Hurdles winner:  Shane Brathwaite
 Women's 100 m Hurdles winner:  Anne Zagré
 Women's High Jump winner:  Levern Spencer
 Women's Long Jump winner:  Anasztázia Nguyen
 Men's Pole Vault winner:  Rutger Koppelaar
 July 20: KBC Night of Athletics in  Heusden-Zolder
 July 24: Joensuu Meeting in  Joensuu
 August 16: Gothenburg Athletic GP in  Gothenburg
 September 1: Galà dei Castelli in  Bellinzona
 September 4: Meeting Guadalajara in  Guadalajara
 September 6: Meeting de Andújar in  Andújar
 September 14: Kamila Skolimowska Memorial Meeting in  Chorzów

EA Area Permit Meetings
 January 6: Cross Zornotza in  Amorebieta-Etxano
 Winners:  Stanley Waithaka (m) /  Trihas Gebre (f)
 January 26: Just Pole Vault in  Stockholm
 Winners:  Pål Haugen Lillefosse (m) /  Angelica Bengtsson (f)
 January 27: Cross de San Sebastián) in  San Sebastián
 Winners:  Hassan Chani (m) /  Irene Sánchez-Escribano (f)
 February 2 & 3: Combined event in  Uppsala
 Men's Decathlon winner:  Fredrik Samuelsson
 Women's Heptatlon winner:  Tilde Johansson
 February 2: International Indoor Meeting in  Luxembourg City
 50 m winners:  Gerrit Wickens (m) /  Patrizia van der Weken (f)
 60 m winners:  Gerrit Wickens (m) /  Patrizia van der Weken (f)
 400 m winners:  Tony van Diepen (m) /  Nadine Gonska (f)
 800 m winners:  Renaud Rosiere (m) /  Renata Vocásková (f)
 1,500 m winners:  Abderrahmane Anou (m) /  Charline Mathias (f)
 Women's 60 m Hurdles winner:  Pauline Lett
 Men's Long Jump winner:  Augustin Bey
 Women's Triple Jump winner:  Susana Costa
 Men Shot Put winner:  Bob Bertemes
 February 10: 10 km Donostia Gimnastica de Ulia in  San Sebastián
 Winners:  David Palacio (m) /  Gema Martín Borgas (f)
 March 1 – 3: RM Winterthrow in  Göteborg
 Shot Put winners:  Gabriel Heen (m) /  Maria Nilsson (f)
 Discus Throw winners:  Theodor Walther (m) /  Emma Ljungberg (f)
 Hammer Throw winners:  Tim Söderqvist (m) /  Tracey Andersson (f)
 Javelin Throw winners:  Sebastian Thörngren (m) /  Mari Klaup (f)
 March 30: XVII Media Marathon Azkoitiapeitia Memorial Diego Garcia in  Azpeitia
 Winners:  Emmanuel Bett (m) /  Meraf Bahta (f)
 April 6: XIV Milla Internacional de Bilbao in  Bilbao
 Winners:  Brahim Elasri (m) /  Iris Fuentes-Pila (f)
 April 20: Trophy of Montenegro in  Bar
 No full result found
 May 1: Caucasus Cup in  Tbilisi
 No full result found
 May 26: International IX Meeting of Castiglione in  Castiglione della Pescaia
 100 m winners:  Marcell Jacobs (m) /  Irene Siragusa (f)
 Men's 200 m winner:  Brendon Rodney
 Women's 400 m winner:  Eleni Artymata
 800 m winners:  Amel Tuka (m) /  Elena Bellò (f)
 3,000 m winners:  Oscar Chelimo (m) /  Martina Merlo (f)
 Men's 3,000 m Steeplechase winner:  Hosea Kimeli Kisorio
 May 26: #13 Meeting Elite de Forbach in  Forbach
 100 m winners:  Usheoritse Itsekiri (m) /  Marie-Ange Rimlinger (f)
 400 m winners:  Gilles Anthony Afoumba (m) /  Aminatou Seyni (f)
 800 m winners:  Tshepo Tshite (m) /  Souliath Saka (f)
 Men's 110 m Hurdles winner:  Dimitri Bascou
 Men's High Jump winner:  Edgar Rivera
 Men's Pole Vault winner:  Alioune Sene
 Women's 100 m Hurdles winner:  Fanny Quenot
 Triple Jump winner winners:  Hugues Fabrice Zango (m) /  Hanna Knyazyeva-Minenko
 Hammer Throw winners:  Pawel Fajdek (m) /  Joanna Fiodorow
 Men's Shot Put winner:  Michał Haratyk
 May 29: 8th Meeting International Citta di Savona in  Savona
 100 m winners:  Marcell Jacobs (m) /  Kristal Awuah (f)
 200 m winners:  Brendon Rodney (m) /  Georgina Adam (f)
 400 m winners:  Michael Berry (m) /  Zoey Clark (f)
 Men's 800 m winner:  Abedin Mujezinović
 Men's 110 m Hurdles winner:  Lorenzo Perini
 Women's 100 m Hurdles winner:  Luminosa Bogliolo
 Men's Long Jump winner:  Filippo Randazzo
 Men's Triple Jump winner:  Tobia Bocchi
 Javelin Throw winners:  Mauro Fraresso (m) /  Zahra Bani (f)
 Men's Shot Put winner:  Orazio Cremona
 May 29: International Military T&F Championship – 19th E. Listos Memorial in  Wrocław
 100 m winners:  Remigiusz Olszewski (m) /  Katarzyna Sokólska (f)
 200 m winners:  Patryk Wykrota (m) /  Anna Kiełbasińska (f)
 400 m winners:  Przemysław Waściński (m) /  Anna Dobek (f)
 800 m winners:  Michał Rozmys (m) /  Natalia Gulczyńska (f)
 1,500 m winners:  Patryk Kozłowski (m) /  Paulina Kaczyńska (f)
 5,000 m winners:  Robert Głowala (m) /  Izabela Trzaskalska (f)
 Men's 110 m Hurdles winner:  Miguel Perera
 Men's 300 m Hurdles winner:  Patryk Dobek
 Women's 400 m Hurdles winner:  Joanna Linkiewicz
 3000 m steeplechase winners:  Roman Rostykus (m) /  Patrycja Kapała (f)
 Men's High Jump winner:  Norbert Kobielski
 Pole Vault winners:  Tomasz Bialic (m) /  Anna Łyko (f)
 Men's Long Jump winner:  Mateusz Jopek
 Men's Triple Jump winner:  Adrian Świderski
 Shot Put winners:  Jakub Szyszkowski (m) /  Paulina Guba (f)
 Men's Discus Throw winner:  Piotr Małachowski
 Javelin Throw winners:  Marcin Krukowski (m) /  Julia Chuda (f)
 June 15–16: Baltic Team Championships/ President's Cup in  Riga
 100 m winners:  Stanislau Darahakupets (m) /  Akvilė Andriukaitytė (f)
 200 m winners:  Gediminas Truskauskas (m) /  Akvilė Andriukaitytė (f)
 400 m winners:  Austris Karpinskis (m) /  Katsiaryna Kharashkevich (f)
 800 m winners:  Benediktas Mickus (m) /  Monika Elenska (f)
 1500 m winners:  Kaur Kivistik (m) /  Monika Elenska (f)
 5000 m winners:  Egidijus Adomkaitis (m) /  Monika Bytautienė (f)
 3000 m steeplechase winners:  Justinas Beržanskis (m) /  Saina Mamedova (f)
 Women's 5000 m winner:  Jekaterina Mirotvortseva
 Men's 10000 m winner:  Uladzimir Kalesnik
 4 × 100 m winners:  (Stanislau Darahakupets, Maksim Hrabarenka, Pavel Dyrda, Yuriy Zabolotnyy (m) /  (Karolina Deliautaitė, Augustė Regalaitė, Akvilė Andriukaitytė, Ugnė Jankauskaitė) (f)
 4 × 400 m winners:  (Karl Erik Nazarov, Marek Niit, Rivar Tipp, Erik Jagor) (m) /  (Annika Sakkarias, Helin Meier, Piibe Kirke Aljas, Liis Roose) (f)
 Men's 110 m Hurdles winner:  Vitali Parakhonka
 Women's 100 m Hurdles winner:  Grit Šadeiko
 400 m Hurdles winners:  Erik Jagor (m) /  Gabija Galvydytė (f)
 Long Jump winners:  Hans-Christian Hausenberg (m) /  Kreete Verlin (f)
 Triple Jump winners:  Maksim Niastsiarenka (m) /  Dovilė Dzindzaletaitė (f)
 High Jump winners:  Adrijus Glebauskas (m) /  Laura Ikauniece-Admidiņa (f)
 Pole Vault winners:  Mareks Ārents (m) /  Marleen Mülla (f)
 Shot Put winners:  Kristo Galeta (m) /  Viktoryia Kolb (f)
 Discus Throw winners:  Martin Kupper (m) /  Ieva Zarankaitė (f)
 Javelin Throw winners:  Edis Matusevičius (m) /  Liveta Jasiūnaitė (f)
 Hammer Throw winners:  Siarhei Kalamoyets (m) /  Anna Maria Orel (f)
 June 19: Jyväskylä Games in  Jyväskylä
 100 m winners:  Hanna-Maari Latvala (f)
 Women's 400 m winner:  Kiah Seymour
 Men's 800 m winner:  Mohamed Aboutahiri
 Women's 3000 m steeplechase winner:  Camilla Richardsson
 Men's 5000 m winner:  Stanislav Maslov
 Men's 110 m Hurdles winner:  Elmo Lakka
 Women's 100 m Hurdles winner:  Klaudia Siciarz
 Men's Long Jump winner:  Roni Ollikainen
 Women's Triple Jump winner:  Senni Salminen
 Hammer Throw winners:  Myhaylo Kokhan (m) /  Krista Tervo (f)
 Men's Pole Vault winner:  Urho Kujanpää
 June 25: Meeting Elite in  Montgeron
 100 m winners:  Simon Magakwe (m) /  Carina Horn (f)
 400 m winners:  Myles Pringle (m) /  Małgorzata Hołub-Kowalik (f)
 800 m winners:  Hamza Belmer (m) /  Cynthia Anaïs (f)
 Men's 3000 m winner:  Rui Pinto
 Men's 110 m Hurdles winner:  Antonio Alkana
 Women's 100 m Hurdles winner:  Vanessa Clervaux
 Women's High Jump winner:  Svetlana Radzivil
 Triple Jump winners:  Andy Díaz (m) /  Susana Costa (f)
 Discus Throw winners:  Apostolos Parellis (m) /  Kristin Pudenz (f)
 June 28: XXIII Meeting Internazionale Citta di Nembro in  Nembro
 100 m winners:  Dlodlo Thando (m) /  Tamzin Thomas (f)
 400 m winners:  Amel Tuka (m) /  Ayomide Folorunso (f)
 800 m winners:  Abdirahman Saeed Hassan (m) /  Serena Troiani (f)
 3000 m winners:  Jerry Mustav (m) /  Marta Zenoni (f)
 Men's 3000 m Steeplechase winner:  Pietro Arese
 Men's 110 m Hurdles winner:  Janet Eaton
 Women's 100 m Hurdles winner:  Génesis Romero
 Long Jump winners:  Gabriele Chilà (m) /  Lynique Beneke (f)
 Women's Pole Vault winner:  Helen Falda
 Men's Javelin Throw winner:  Mauro Fraresso
 Women's Discus Throw winner:  Andressa de Morais
 July 3: Tamperen Games in  Tampere
 Men's 200 m winner:  Yaqoob Salem Eid
 Women's 800 m winner:  Sara Kuivisto
 Men's 1500 m winner:  Ashley Smith
 Women's 100 m Hurdles winner:  Reetta Hurske
 400 m Hurdles winners:  Tibor Koroknai (m) /  Aminat Yusuf Jamal (f)
 Men's Pole Vault winner:  Tommi Holttinen
 High Jump winners:  Daniel Kosonen (m) /  Ella Junnila (f)
 Women's Long Jump winner:  Maria Huntington
 Women's Discus Throw winner:  Anna Rüh
 Men's Javelin Throw winner:  Keshorn Walcott
 July 6: 12th Triveneto Meeting International in  Trieste
 100 m winners:  Thando Dlodlo (m) /  Natalliah Whyte (f)
 400 m winners:  Akeem Bloomfield (m) /  Junelle Bromfield (f)
 Women's 800 m winner:  Joyce Mattagliano
 Men's 1500 m winner:  Matteo Spanu
 Men's 110 m Hurdles winner:  Nicholas Hough
 Men's 100 m Hurdles winner:  Megan Simmonds
 Men's Long Jump winner:  
 Men's Javelin Throw winner:  Kacper Oleszczuk
 July 7: Mityng na Rynku Kościuszki in  Białystok
 High Jump winners:  Ilya Ivanyuk (m) /  Kamila Lićwinko (f)
 Men's Pole Vault winner:  Piotr Lisek
 Shot Put winners:  Darlan Romani (m) /  Danniel Thomas-Dodd (f)
 July 9: 30th Meeting Internazionale di Atletica Leggera Sport Soudarieta in  Lignano Sabbiadoro
 100 m winners:  Mike Rodgers (m) /  Rosângela Santos (f)
 Men's 400 m winner:  Machel Cedenio
 800 m winners:  Jamie Webb (m) /  Eunice Sum (f)
 1500 m winners:  Matthew Ramsden (m) /  Rachel Schneider (f)
 Women's 100 m Hurdles winner:  Jasmine Camacho-Quinn
 Men's 400 m Hurdles winner:  Robert Grant
 Women's High Jump winner:  Maruša Černjul
 Women's Long Jump winner:  Kate Hall
 Men's Discus Throw winner:  Danijel Furtula
 July 15: Varberg GP in  Varberg
 100 m winners:  Everton Clarke (m) /  Astrid Glenner-Frandsen
 Women's 200 m winner:  Moa Hjelmer
 800 m winners:  Berhe Kidane (m) /  Catriona Bisset
 Men's 110 m Hurdles winner:  Fredrick Ekholm
 Women's 100 m Hurdles winner:  Thea Haahr
 Men's 1000 m winner:  Collins Kipruto
 Women's 3000 m winner:  Samrawit Mengsteab
 Women's High Jump winner:  Marija Vuković
 Long Jump winners:  Andreas Carlsson (m) /  Tilde Johansson (f)
 Shot Put winners:  Wictor Petersson (m) /  Fanny Roos (f)
 Discus Throw winners:  Daniel Ståhl (m) /  Anna Rüh (f)
 Women's Pole Vault winner:  Alysha Newman
 July 17: Savo Games in  Lapinlahti
 Men's 100 m winner:  Jonathan Nyepa
 Women's 200 m winner:  Hafsatu Kamara
 1500 m winners:  Timo Benitz (m) /  Janica Rauma (f)
 Men's 3000 m steeplechase winner:  Bilal Tabti
 Women's 5000 m winner:  Katsiaryna Karneyenka
 Women's 100 m Hurdles winner:  Annimari Korte
 Women's Discus Throw winner:  Anna Rüh
 Men's Javelin Throw winner:  Edis Matusevičius
 Men's Long Jump winner:  Zarck Visser
 Men's Pole Vault winner:  Urho Kujanpää
 Women's Shot Put winner:  Senja Mäkitörmä
 July 18: 31st Arcobaleno Atletica Europa in  Celle Ligure
 100 m winners:  Jerry Japka (m) /  Joy Udo-Gabriel (f)
 200 m winners:  Jerry Japka (m) /  Joy Udo-Gabriel (f)
 400 m winners:  Dan Putnam (m) /  Evelin Nádházy (f)
 800 m winners:  Abdessalam Machmach (m) /  Irene Vian (f)
 Men's 110 m Hurdles winner:  Paulo Henrique da Silva
 Women's 100 m Hurdles winner:  Petra Répási
 400 m Hurdles winners:  Keisuke Nozawa (m) /  Zenéy van der Walt (f)
 High Jump winners:  Mpho Links (m) /  Aurora Burdese (f)
 Long Jump winners:  Alessandro Li Veli (m) /  Éloyse Lesueur-Aymonin (f)
 Shot Put winners:  Balázs Detrik (m) /  Sofia Kila (f)
 August 3: #29 (Citius Meeting) in  Bern
 August 3: #30 (Kamila Skolimowska Throwing Festival) in  Władysławowo
 August 14: #31 (Cork City Games) in  Cork
 August 18: #32 (Meeting International Schifflange) in  Schifflange
 August 21: #33 (Morten Games) in  Dublin
 August 24 & 25: #34 (Finnkampen Sweden vs Finland) in  Stockholm
 September 13: #35 (Madrid Street Athletics) in  Madrid
 October 5: #36 (32nd Milla Internacional de Berango) in  Berango
 November 24: #37 (42nd Zurich Marathon San Sebastián) in  San Sebastián
 November 25: #38 (XXX Carrera Internacional Desde Santurce a Bilbao) in  Santurtzi-Bilbao

EA Outdoor Special Premium Meetings
 June 12: Filothei Women Gala in  Filothei
 Women's 100 m winner:  Remona Burchell
 100 m Hurdles winner:  Ruslana Rashkovan
 Women's High Jump winner:  Tatiana Gousin
 Women's Long Jump winner:  Abigail Irozuru
 Women's Triple Jump winner:  Jenny Elbe
 Women's Pole Vault winner:  Katerina Stefanidi
 June 21: (Athens Street Pole Vault 2019) in  Athens
 Men's Pole Vault winner:  Piotr Lisek

EA Premium Meetings
 July 9: Gyulai István Memorial in  Székesfehérvar
 200 m winners:  Christian Coleman (m) /  Shaunae Miller-Uibo (f)
 Women's 400 m winner:  Salwa Eid Naser
 Women's 2000 m winner:  Genzebe Dibaba
 Men's 3000 m winner:  Michael Kibet
 Men's 110 m Hurdles winner:  Grant Holloway
 Women's 100 m Hurdles winner:  Kendra Harrison
 400 m Hurdles winners:  Byron Robinson (m) /  Ashley Spencer (f)
 Men's High Jump winner:  Ilya Ivanyuk
 Women's Long Jump winner:  Yelena Sokolova
 Men's Triple Jump winner:  Christian Taylor
 Men's Discus Throw winner:  Daniel Ståhl
 Hammer Throw winners:  Paweł Fajdek (m) /  Alexandra Tavernier (f)
 Women's Shot Put winner:  Danniel Thomas-Dodd
 July 9: Spitzen Leichtathletik Luzern in  Luzern
 100 m winners:  Akani Simbine (m) /  Gina Lückenkemper (f)
 200 m winners:  Akeem Bloomfield (m) /  Tynia Gaither (f)
 Women's 400 m winner:  Junelle Bromfield
 Women's 800 m winner:  Sarah McDonald
 1500 m winners:  Michael Curti (m) /  Nicole Egger (f)
 Men's 3000 m winner:  Tadese Worku
 Men's 110 m Hurdles winner:  Xie Wenjun
 Women's 100 m Hurdles winner:  Oluwatobiloba Amusan
 400 m Hurdles winners:  Abdelmalik Lahoulou (m) /  Nikita Tracey (f)
 Men's Long Jump winner:  Ruswahl Samaai
 Hammer Throw winners:  Tristan Schwandke (m) /  Charlene Woitha (f)
 Javelin Throw winners:  Thomas Röhler (m) /  Kelsey-Lee Roberts (f)
 Women's Pole Vault winner:  Alysha Newman
 August 27: #3 (55th Palio Citta della Quercia) in  Rovereto
 September 8: #4 (Rieti Meeting) in  Rieti

CAA Major Events
 April 16 – 20: 2019 African U20 Championships in Athletics & African Youth Athletics Championships in  Abidjan

OAA
Permit Meetings
 January 18: Capital Classic in  Wellington
 100 m winners:  Jake Paul (m) /  Sophie Williams (f)
 200 m winners:  Edward Nketia (m) /  Zoe Hobbs (f)
 400 m winners:  Luke Mercieca (m) /  Emma Osborne (f)
 800 m:  Samuel Tanner (m) /  Katherine Camp (f)
 Women's 100 m Hurdles winner:  Amy Robertson
 400 m Hurdles winners:  Louis Andrews (m) /  Portia Bing (f)
 Women's High Jump winner:  Josephine Reeves
 Men's Long Jump winner:  Jordan Peters
 Women's Triple Jump winner:  Ellie Hurley-Langton
 Discus Throw winners:  Connor Bell (m) /  Siositina Hakeai (f)
 Javelin Throw winners:  Cam Robinson (m) /  Lexi Maples (f)
 4 × 100 m Relay winners:  Blue  (m) /  A  (f)
 January 25: Hunter Track Classic in  Newcastle
 100 m winners:  Anas Abu-Ganaba (m) /  Michelle Jenneke (f)
 600 m winners:  Peter Bol (m) /  Morgan Mitchell (f)
 1,500 m winners:  Luke Mathews (m) /  Madeleine Murray
 Men's 3,000 m Steeplechase winner:  Max Stevens
 Women's 100 m Hurdles winner:  Michelle Jenneke
 High Jump winners:  Zachary Hayward (m) /  Hannah Joye (f)
 Triple Jump winners:  Connor Murphy (m) /  Desleigh Owusu (f)
 Men's Discus Throw winner:  Lachlan McEntyre
 Women's Hammer Throw winner:  Alexandra Hulley
 Men's Shot Put winner:  Damien Birkinhead
 Mixed 1 Mile winner:  Matthew Joyce
 January 27 & 28: Canberra Track Classic in  Canberra
 100 m winners:  Jack Hale (m) /  Celeste Mucci (f)
 200 m winners:  Edward Nketia (m) /  Maddie Coates (f)
 400 m winners:  Tyler Gunn (m) /  Angeline Blackburn (f)
 Women's 800 m winner:  Katherine Camp
 Men's 1,500 m winner:  Sean Antion Tobin
 Men's 110 m Hurdles winner:  Nicholas Hough
 400 m Hurdles winners:  Michael Cochrane (m) /  Sarah Carli (f)
 Long Jump winners:  Henry Smith (m) /  Brooke Stratton (f)
 Women's Triple Jump winner:  Mariia Sinei
 Men's Pole Vault winner:  Kurtis Marschall
 Women's Discus Throw winner:  Taryn Gollshewsky
 Hammer Throw winners:  William Brown (m) /  Alexandra Hulley (f)
 Javelin Throw winners:  Ben Langton Burnell (m) /  Tori Peeters (f)
 Men's Shot Put winner:  Damien Birkinhead
 February 9: Porritt Classic in  Hamilton
 100 m winners:  Edward Nketia (m) /  Brooke Somerfield (f)
 200 m winners:  Edward Nketia (m) /  Abby Goldie (f)
 400 m winners:  Luke Mercieca (m) /  Charlotte Holland (f)
 800 m winners:  Dominic Devlin (m) /  Stella Pearless (f)
 1,500 m winners:  Jacob Priddey (m) /  Katherine Camp (f)
 100 m Hurdles winners:  Zachary Saunders (m) /  Fiona Morrison (f)
 Men's 110 m Hurdles winners:  Joshua Hawkins
 400 m Hurdles winners:  Olly Parkinson (m) /  Alessandra Macdonald (f)
 High Jump winners:  Hamish Kerr (m) /   Keeley O'Hagan (f)
 Long Jump winners:  Jordan Peters (m) /  Corinna Minko (f)
 Javelin Throw:  Genki Dean (m) /  Tori Peeters (f)
 Shot Put winners:  Jacko Gill (m) /  Maddi Wesche (f)
 Mixed Discus Throw winner:  Siositina Hakeai
 Mixed Hammer Throw winner:  Antony Nobilo
 February 23: Sydney Track Classic in  Sydney
 Men's 100 m winner:  Jack Hale
 Women's 200 m winner:  Olivia Eaton
 400 m winners:  Alexander Beck (m) /  Anneliese Rubie-Renshaw (f)
 800 m winners:  Brad Mathas (m) /  Georgia Griffith (f)
 1,500 m winners:  Ryan Gregson (m) /  Madeleine Murray (f)
 Men's 3,000 m Steeplechase winner:  Max Stevens
 5,000 m winners:  Jordan Gusman (m) /  Melissa Duncan (f)
 Women's 100 m Hurdles winner:  Celeste Mucci
 Men's 110 m Hurdles winner:  Nicholas Andrews
 400 m Hurdles winners:  Ian Dewhurst (m) /  Portia Bing (f)
 Women's High Jump winner:  Nicola McDermott
 Women's Long Jump winner:  Brooke Stratton
 Men's Triple Jump winner:  Alwyn Jones
 Pole Vault winners:  Angus Armstrong (m) /  Olivia McTaggart (f)
 Women's Discus Throw winner:  Kim Mulhall
 Hammer Throw winners:  William Brown (m) /  Alexandra Hulley (f)
 Javelin Throw winners:  Hamish Peacock (m) /  Katrina Blackett (f)
 Women's Shot Put winner:  Victoria Owers
 Mixed 4 × 400 m Relay winners:  Ryde Little Athletics
 March 2: Sir Peter Snell International Meeting in  Whanganui
 Women's 100 m winner:  Sophie Williams
 Men's 200 m winner:  Joseph Millar
 400 m winners:  Travis Bayler (m) /  Tayla Brunger (f)
 Men's 800 m winner:  Brad Mathas
 Long Jump winners:  Jordan Peters (m) /  Genna Maples (f)
 Women's Hammer Throw winner:  Nicole Bradley
 Shot Put winners:  Josefa Tamaniyaga (m) /  Nicole Bennett (f)
 Men's 1 Mile winner:  Rorey Hunter
 Mixed 800 m winner:  Rebecca Baker
 March 16: Perth Track Classic in  Perth
 100 m winners:  Jack Hale (m) /  Sophie White (f)
 200 m winners:  Rohan Browning (m) /  Sophie White (f)
 Men's 400 m winner:  Adam Kopp
 800 m winners:  Luke Mathews (m) /  Georgia Griffith (f)
 Women's 100 m Hurdles winner:  Brianna Beahan
 Men's 110 m Hurdles winner:  Nicholas Andrews
 400 m Hurdles winners:  Ian Dewhurst (m) /  Alanah Yukich (f)
 High Jump winners:  Grant Szalek (m) /  Nicola McDermott
 Long Jump winners:  Darcy Roper (m) /  Naa Anang (f)
 Pole Vault winners:  Declan Carruthers (m) /  Lauren Hyde-Cooling
 Javelin Throw winners:  Hamish Peacock (m) /  Lara Ilievski (f)
 Men's 1 Mile winner:  Matthew Ramsden
 Mixed Discus Throw winner:  Matthew Denny
 Mixed Shot Put winner:  Etienne Rousseau
 Mixed 1 Mile winner:  Cameron Quirk
 Mixed 4 × 100 m winners:  City of Melville
 March 21: Sir Graeme Douglas International in  Auckland
 100 m winners:  Edward Nketia (m) /  Portia Bing (f)
 Men's 400 m winner:  Luke Mercieca
 800 m winners:  Sam Petty (m) /  Katherine Camp (f)
 Men's 5,000 m winner:  Oli Chignell
 Women's High Jump winner:  Josephine Reeves
 Pole Vault winners:  Nick Southgate (m) /  Olivia McTaggart (f)
 Shot Put winners:  Konrad Bukowiecki (m) /  Chase Ealey (f)
 Mixed 4 × 100 m winners:  Men (Jacob Stockwell, Matteus Pio, Tyron Hilton, Mogammad Smith)
 March 23: Queensland Track Classic in  Brisbane
 100 m winners:  Yoshihide Kiryū (m) /  Zoe Hobbs (f)
 200 m winners:  Yoshihide Kiryū (m) /  Nana-Adoma Owusu-Afriyie (f)
 400 m winners:  Julian Walsh (m) /  Ellie Beer (f)
 Men's 800 m winner:  Mason Cohen (m) /
 1,500 m winners:  Luke Mathews (m) /  Madeleine Murray (f)
 Men's 110 m Hurdles winner:  Nicholas Hough
 Women 100 m Hurdles winner:  Michelle Jenneke
 400 m Hurdles winners:  Ryo Kajiki (m) /  Mayu Saito (f)
 High Jump winners:  Hamish Kerr (m) /  Cassie Purdon (f)
 Triple Jump winners:  Muhammad Hakimi Ismail (m) /  Ellen Pettitt (f)
 Long Jump winners:  Darcy Roper (m) /  Brooke Stratton (f)
 Discus Throw winners:  Matthew Denny (m) /  Taryn Gollshewsky (f)
 Javelin Throw winners:  Liam O'Brien (m) /  Kelsey-Lee Barber (f)
 Men's Shot Put winner:  Damien Birkinhead
 Mixed 3,000 m Relay winner:  Dane Bird-Smith
 Men's 4 × 100 m Relay winners:  (Jake Doran, Rohan Browning, Jack Hale, Alex Hartmann)
 Mixed 4 × 400 m Relay winners:  (Ian Halpin, Tyler Gunn, Alexander Beck, Steven Solomon)
 June 21: Oceania Invitational in  Townsville
 July 6: Fiji International Grand Prix in  Lautoka (final)
 100 m winners:  Banuve Tabakaucoro (m) /  Heleina Young (f)
 200 m winners:  Banuve Tabakaucoro (m) /  Taina Halasima (f)
 400 m winners:  Kameli Ravuci (m) /  Ana Baleveicau (f)
 800 m winners:  Petero Veitagomaki (m) /  Genina Criss (f)
 3000 m winners:  Avikash Lal (m) /  Vilimaina Naituku (f)
 Men's 110 m Hurdles winner:  Talatala Po'oi
 Women's 100 m Hurdles winner:  Elenani Tinal
 High Jump winners:  Mosese Foliaki (m) /  Shawntell Lockington (f)
 Long Jump winners:  Ryuji Yamazaki (m) /  Elenani Tinal (f)
 Triple Jump winners:  Eugene Vollmer (m) /  Fane Savvakacolo (f)
 Javelin Throw winners:  Takuya Mayajima (m) /  Elena Caucau (f)
 Discus Throw winners:  Mustafa Fall (m) /  Atamaama Tu'utafaiva (f)
 Shot Put winners:  Mustafa Fall (m) /  Atamaama Tu'utafaiva (f)
 Mixed 4 × 100 m Relay winners:  B
 Mixed 4 × 400 m Relay winners:  B

Major Events
 February 17: Oceania 10 km Road Championships in  Hobart
 Winners:  Brett Robinson (m) /  Milly Clark (f)
 June 25 – 28: Oceania Area Championships in  Townsville
 June 28: Oceania 10 km Racewalk Championships in  Townsville
 July 7: Oceania Marathon and Half Marathon Championships in  Gold Coast
 August 31 – September 7: Oceania Masters Athletics Championships in TBD place
 December 2: Oceania 50 km Racewalk Championships in  Melbourne

AAA Major Events and Asian Permit Meetings
 March 2 & 3: Southeast Asian Youth Athletics Championships in  Ilagan

 : 
 : 
 : 
 4th: 
 March 15 – 17: 2019 Asian Youth Athletics Championships in 

 : 
 : 
 : 
 4th: 
 April 21 – 24: 2019 Asian Athletics Championships in  Doha
 : 
 : 
 : 
 4th: 

Asian Permit Meetings
 April 21: 67th Hyōgo Relay Carnival in  Kobe (PM #1)
 April 27 – 29: 53rd Oda Memorial Meet in  Hiroshima (PM #2)
 May 3: 35th Shizuoka International Meet in  Fukuroi
 May 6: Michitaka Kinami Memorial Meet in  Osaka
 May 25: Taiwan Open Athletics Championships in  Taipei
 100 m winners:  Andre De Grasse (m) /  Lam On Ki (f)
 200 m winners:  Kenji Fujimitsu (m) /  Veronica Shanti Pereira (f)
 400 m:  Kentarō Satō (m) /  Nanako Matsumoto (f)
 800 m winners:  Taichi Ichino (m) /  Shen Chia-ni (f)
 1,500 m winners:  Wen-Lien Chung (m) /  Kim Kuk-hyang (f)
 5,000 m winners:  Lee Chi-ju (m) /  Nguyễn Thị Oanh (f)
 Men's 10,000 m winner:  Ho Chin-ping
 3000 m steeplechase winners:  Lee Chi-ju (m) /  Nguyễn Thị Oanh (f)
 Men's 110 m Hurdles winner:  Chen Kuei-ru
 Women's 100 m Hurdles winner:  Hitomi Shimura
 400 m Hurdles winners:  Chen Chieh (m) /  Robyn Brown (f)
 High Jump winners:  Keitarō Fujita (m) /  Wanida Boonwan (f)
 Long Jump winners:  Lin Yu-tang (m) /  Yue Ya Xin (f)
 Triple Jump winners:  Christian Taylor (m) /  Hà Vũ Thị Ngọc (f)
 Discus Throw winners:  Masateru Yugami (m) /  Subenrat Insaeng (f)
 Hammer Throw winners:  Ryota Kashimura (m) /  Akane Watanabe
 Javelin Throw:  Cheng Chao-tsun (m) /  Chiu Yu-ting (f)
 Pole Vault winners:  Jin Min-sub (m) /  Shen Yi-Ju (f)
 Shot Put:  Jung Il-woo (m) /  Lin Jia-ying (f)
 4 × 100 m winners:  (Wei Tai-sheng, Wang Wei-hsu, Yang Chun-han, Cheng Po-yu) (m) /  (Sureewan Runan, Kwanrutai Pakdee, Tassaporn Wannakit, Supawan Thipat) (f)
 4 × 400 m winners:  (Lai Kuan-yu, Yu Chen-yi, Chen Chieh, Yang Lung-Hsiang) (m) /  (Sureewan Runan, Arisa Weruwanarak, Ratchada Talee, Chinenye Josephine Onuorah) (f)

NACAC Permit Meetings
 February 22: Gibson – McCook Relays in  Kingston (PM #1)
 100 m winners:  Andrew Fisher (m) /  Kemba Nelson (f)
 400 m winners:  Malik James-King (m) /  Sada Williams (f)
 1,600 m winners:  Chadoye Dawson (m) /  Samantha James (f)
 High Jump winners:  Carlington Moulton (m) /  Janique Burgher (f)
 Long Jump winners:  Wayne Pinnock (m) /  Tamara Myers (f)
 Men's Pole Vault winner:  Andrew Betton (m)
 March 15 & 16: 14TH Spring Break Classic in  Gurabo (PM #2)
 100 m winners:  Raymond Moises Urbino Tejada (m) /  Aries Sánchez (f)
 200 m winners:  Adrian Agosto (m) /  Grace Claxton (f)
 400 m winners:  Michael Jordan (m) /  Asaine Hall (f)
 800 m winners:  Shevan Parks (m) /  Angelin Figueroa (f)
 1,500 m winners:  Erik Estrada (m) /  Angie Nocua (f)
 3000 metres steeplechase winners:  Yuber Echeverri (m) /  Carolina Lozano (f)
 Men's 5,000 m winner:  Nahir Pinto
 Women's 10,000 m winner:  Ashley Laureano
 Men's 110 m winner:  Sidney Gibbons
 Women's 100 m winner:  Sophia Myers
 400 m Hurdles winners:  Ramfis Vega (m) /  Grace Claxton (f)
 Pole Vault winners:  Luis Martinez (m) /  Yaritza Diaz (f)
 High Jump winners:  Joshua Medina (m) /  Ariana Maldonado (f)
 Long Jump winners:  Michael Williams (m) /  Aries Sánchez (f)
 Triple Jump winners:  Edinson Luna (m) /  Candy Toche (f)
 Discus Throw winners:  Ediberto Gonzalez (m) /  Venique Harris (f)
 Hammer Throw winners:  Jerome Vega (m) /  Franshesly Rodríguez Torres (f)
 Javelin Throw winners:  Félix Torres (m) /  Coralys Ortiz (f)
 Shot Put winners:  Albert Crespo (m) /  Tara Belisnky
 4 × 100 m winners:  Interamerican University (Ricardo Feliciano Pineir, Raymond Moises Urbino Tejada, Alexis Ojeda, Jose Mojica) (m) /  Fairleigh Dickinson (Jazmyn Lewis, Kylia Smith, Shanice Watkins, Madeline Price)
 4 × 400 m winners:  University at Albany (Alex Velazquez, Matt Leliever, Walter Briggs, Jan Michael Gutierrez) (m) /  Interamerican University (Yamilette Gonzalez, Nilitza Malave, Magaly Correa, Geisha Castro)
 April 6: 3rd Barbados and Trinidad & Tobago Youth Dual in  Port of Spain (PM #3)
 Cancelled
 Cancelled
 April 13: Blas Beato Memoriam Track Meet in  Havana (PM #5)
 April 26 & 27: Drake Relays in  Des Moines (PM #6)
 1,500 m winners:  Jed Helker (m) /  Scarlet Dale (f)
 3,000 m Steeplechase winners:  Awet Yohannes (m) /  Breanna Sieracki (f)
 5,000 m winners:  Reed Fischer (m) /  Maddie Van Beek (f)
 10,000 m winners:  Brogan Austin (m) /  Megan Billington (f)
 Pole Vault winners:  Andrew Irwin (m) /  Emily Grove (f)
 Men's Decathlon winner:  Teddy Frid
 Women's Heptathlon winner:  Emilyn Dearman
 April 27: Penn Relays in  Philadelphia
 Sprint Medley winners:  (Mike Mokamba Nyang'au, Alphas Kishoyian, Collins Omae Gichana, Collins Kipruto) (m) /  (Dezerea Bryant, Aaliyah Brown, Destiny Carter, Raevyn Rogers) (f)
 4 × 100 m winners:  Red (Christopher Belcher, Bryce Robinson, Isiah Young, Mike Rodgers) (m) /  (Shelly-Ann Fraser-Pryce, Natasha Morrison, Shillonie Calvert, Shashalee Forbes) (f)
 4 × 400 m winners:  Red (Mylik Kerley, Michael Cherry, Dontavius Wright, Je'von Hutchison) (m) /  Gold (Shericka Jackson, Janieve Russell, Christine Day, Stephenie Ann McPherson) (f)
 May 4: Quadrangular Meet in  Santo Domingo
 June 1: Cayman Islands Invitational in  George Town
 June 7: Speed River Inferno Guelph in 
 100 m winners:  Kenzo Cotton (m) /  Shaina Harrison (f)
 400 m winners:  Philip Osei (m) /  Alicia Brown (f)
 800 m winners:  Stephen Evans (m) /  Melissa Bishop (f)
 1,500 m winners:  Craig Klomp (m) /  Geneviève Lalonde (f)
 Pole Vault winners:  Miloš Savić (m) /  Alysha Newman (f)
 Men's High Jump winner:  Herbert Gary
 June 8: Racers Grand Prix in  Kingston
 June 29: BVI Twilight Meeting in 
 July 1: Harry Jerome Classic in  Vancouver
 October 19: Guadeloupe Petit-Bourg NACAC 10K in

NACAC Major Events
 January 27: CADICA Cross Country Championships in  San José
 10 km winners:  Juan Ramón Fallas (m) /  Idelma Delgado (f)
 U20 8 km winners:  Jorge Jesus Prendas (m) /  Noelia Vargas (f)
 February 16: 2019 NACAC Cross Country Championships in  Port of Spain
 U20 winners:  Evan Burke (b) /  Taryn O'Neill (g)
 Senior winners:  Abbabiya Simbassa (m) /  Breanna Sieracki (f)
 February 23 & 24: 2019 CADICA Race Walking Championships in  Guatemala City
 50 km winners:  Erick Barrondo (m) /  Mirna Ortiz (f)
 20 km winners:  José Calel (m) /  Maritza Poncio (f)
 May 17 – 19: 2019 CADICA U18 – U20 Championships in  San Salvador
 1st place: , 2nd place: , 3rd place: , 4th place: , 5th place: , 6th place: , 7th place: 
 June 21 – 23: 2019 Central American Championships in Athletics in  Managua
 1st place: , 2nd place: , 3rd place: , 4th place: , 5th place: , 6th place: , 7th place: 
 July 5 – 7: 2019 NACAC U23 Championships in Athletics in  Querétaro
 Ranking after medals (U18): 1. , 2. , 3. , 4. , 5. , 7. , 8.
 Ranking after medals (U23): 1. , 2. , 3. 
 July 6 & 7: 2019 Pan American Combined Events Cup in  Ottawa
 July 19 – 21: 2019 Pan American U20 Athletics Championships in  San José
 November 22 – 24: 2019 Central American Age Group Championships in Athletics in  Panama City

CONSUDATLE
CONSUDATLE Permit Meetings
 March 23 & 24: Grand Prix Estrella Puente in  Montevideo
 100 m winners:  Mateo Vargas (m) /  Anny Caroline de Bassi
 400 m winners:  Bruno Rihan Suello da Silva (m) /  Poulette Cardoch Ramos (f)
 Women's 800 m winner:  Jaqueline Beatriz Weber
 Men's 1,500 m winner:  Fabián Manrique
 5,000 m winners:  Cristian Moreno (m) /  Angie Moreno (f)
 Women's 10,000 m winner:  Natalie Bengoa
 3,000 m steeplechase winners:  Antonio Ruiz (m) /  Tatiane Raquel da Silva (f)
 High Jump winners:  Mauro Pons (m) /   (f)
 Men's Long Jump winner:  Lucas Marcelino dos Santos
 Pole Vault winners:  Abel Curtinove (m) /  Bruna Rigo (f)
 Discus Throw winners:  Rodolfo Casanova (m) /  Adriele Petini (f)
 Hammer Throw winners:  Leanderson Souza Ferreira (m) /  Tania Milena Ancelmo da Silva (f)
 Javelin Throw winners:  Lautaro Techera (m) /  Martina Corra (f)
 4 × 400 m winners:  (m) /  (f)
 March 24: Grand Prix Darwin Piñeyrúa in  Montevideo
 200 m winners:  Bruno Rihan Suello da Silva (m) /  Anny Caroline de Bassi (f)
 Men's 800 m winner:  Jairo Moreira
 Women's 1,500 m winner:  Tatiane Raquel da Silva
 Men's 10,000 m winner:  Luis Molina
 400 m Hurdles winners:  Alfredo Sepúlveda (m) /  Rocío Donnet (f)
 Women's Long Jump winner:  Eduarda Schmitt da Silva
 Triple Jump winners:  Maximiliano Díaz (m) /  Pyetra Romero Barcellos (f)
 Shot Put winners:  Saymon Rangel Hoffmann (m) /  Adriele Petini (f)
 4 × 100 m winners:  (m) /  (f)
 March 29: Grand Prixs Sudamericano Noemí Simonetto in  Concepción del Uruguay
 100 m winners:  Otilio Rosa Puntiel (m) /  Vitória Cristina Rosa (f)
 800 m winners:  Lucirio Antonio Garrido (m) /  Mariana Borelli (f)
 Men's 5000 m winner:  José Zabala
 400 m Hurdles winners:  Alfredo Sepúlveda (m) /  Alessandra Santos Silva
 Men's High Jump winner:  Guilherme Cobbo
 Men's Long Jump winner:  Tiago Da Silva
 Men's Hammer Throw winner:  Humberto Mansilla
 Men's Javeline Throw winner:  Braian Toledo
 Men's Pole Vault winner:  Germán Chiaraviglio
 March 30: Grand Prixs Sudamericano 50 Aniversario del CEF N° 3 in  Concepción del Uruguay
 Men's 200 m winner:  Otilio Rosa Puntiel
 400 m winners:  Alfredo Sepúlveda (m) /  Noelia Anahí Martínez (f)
 Women's 5,000 m winner:  Florencia Borelli
 Men's 110 m Hurdles winner:  Agustín Carrera
 Women's 100 m Hurdles winner:  María Ignacia Eguiguren
 Women's High Jump winner:  Lorena Aires
 Women's Long Jump winner:  Macarena Reyes
 Men's Triple Jump winner:  Miguel van Assen
 Women's Discus Throw winner:  Karen Gallardo
 Women's Hammer Throw winner:  Jennifer Dahlgren
 Women's Javelin Throw winner:  Johana Arias Dominella
 Women's Pole Vault winner:  Sofia Hryncyszyn
 Shot Put winners:  Germán Lauro (m) /  Ivana Gallardo (f)
 March 31: Grand Prixs Sudamericano Hugo La Nasa in  Concepción del Uruguay
 100 m winners:  Otilio Rosa Puntiel (m) /  Vitória Cristina Rosa (f)
 1,500 m winners:  Lucirio Antonio Garrido (m) /  Florencia Borelli (f)
 Men's 110 m Hurdles winner:  Agustín Carrera
 Men's High Jump winner:  Talles Silva
 Men's Long Jump winner:  Daniel Pineda
 Hammer Throw winners:  Gabriel Kehr (m) /  Mariana Marcelino (f)
 Men's Javeline Throw winner:  Arley Ibargüen
 Men's Pole Vault winner:  Augusto Dutra de Oliveira
 Shot Put winners:  Germán Lauro (m) /  Ivana Gallardo (f)
 4 × 400 m winners:  1 (Damián Moretta, Matías Falchetti, Pedro Garrido, Elián Larregina) (m) /  1 (María Ayelén Diogo, Fiorella Chiappe, Valeria Mariana Baron, Noelia Anahí Martínez)
 April 4: Grand Prix Ciudad de Concepción in  Concepción
 Women's 100 m winner:  Vitória Cristina Rosa
 Men's 400 m winner:  Mahagu Sogimati
 Men's 800 m winner:  Lucirio Antonio Garrido
 Women's 1,500 m winner:  María Pía Fernández
 Men's 5,000 m winner:  Fabián Manrique
 Men's Long Jump winner:  Alexsandro de Melo
 April 6: Grand Prix Orlando Guaita in  Santiago
 Women's 100 m winner:  Vitória Cristina Rosa
 400 m winners:  Alfredo Sepúlveda (m) /  Noelia Martínez (f)
 1,500 m winners:  Lucirio Antonio Garrido (m) /  María Pía Fernández (f)
 Women's Long Jump winner:  Keila Costa
 Men's Triple Jump winner:  Alexsandro de Melo
 Men's Hammer Throw winner:  Gabriel Kehr
 Men's Javeline Throw winner:  Braian Toledo
 April 13 & 14: Grand Prix Richard Boroto in  Cuenca
 200 m winners:  Andreson Marquinez (m) /  Diana Bazalar (f)
 Women's 800 m winner:  Andrea Calderon
 Women's 100 m Hurdles winner:  Diana Bazalar
 Men's Discus Throw winner:  Mauricio Ortega
 Women's Hammer Throw winner:  Valeria Chiliquinga
 Javelin Throw winners:  José Escobar (m) /  María Lucelly Murillo (f)
 Triple Jump winners:  Frixon Chila (m) /  Liuba Maria Zaldívar (f)
 Men's Pole Vault winner:  Dyander Pacho
 Women's 4 × 100 m Relay winner: 
 April 24: Grand Prix Mario Paz in  Cochabamba
 100 m winners:  Christopher Ortiz (m) /  Javiera Cañas (f)
 200 m winners:  Jhonatan Chavez (m) /  María Fernanda Mackenna (f)
 400 m winners:  Andres Sotomayor Arebalo (m) /  Cecilia Evangelina Gomez Lopez (f)
 5,000 m winners:  Daniel Toroya Paqui (m) /  Brianda Escalera (f)
 Women's 100 m Hurdles winner:  Ana Camila Pirelli
 Long Jump winners:  Erick Suarez Lima (m) /  Keila Costa (f)
 Triple Jump winners:  Alexandro do Nascemento (m) /  Gabrielle Souza Santos (f)
 Men's Javeline Throw winner:  Mauricio Britos
 Men's Shot Put winner:  Willian Braido
 April 26: Grand Prix Julia Iriarte in  Cochabamba
 100 m winners:  Enrique Polanco (m) /  Isidora Jiménez (f)
 200 m winners:  Jhonatan Chavez (m) /  Isidora Jiménez (f)
 400 m winners:  Andres Sotomayor Arebalo (m) /  María Fernanda Mackenna (f)
 1,500 m winners:  Rubén Toroya Paqui (m) /  Helen Daniela Baltazar (f)
 Long Jump winners:  Emiliano Lasa (m) /  Keila Costa (f)
 Triple Jump winners:  Mateus de Sá (m) /  Gabrielle Souza Santos (f)
 Men's Javelin Throw winner:  Mauricio de Brito Filgueiras
 Men's Shot Put winner:  Willian Braido
 Men's 4 × 100 m winners:  (Rodrigo Opazo, Enrique Polanco, Enzo Faulman, Ignacio Nordetti)
 May 1: Grand Prix Internacional Ximena Restrepo in  Medellín
 100 m winners:  Arnaldo Romero Crespo (m) /  Darlenys Obregón (f)
 Men's 200 m winner:  Bernardo Baloyes
 400 m winners:  Antony Zambrano De la Cruz (m) /  Asaine Hall (f)
 800 m winners:  Jorge Félix Liranzo Martínez (m) /  Johana Arrieta
 Men's 3000 metres steeplechase winner:  Fabian Hinestroza
 5000 m winners:  Carlos Andres Sanmartin (m) /  Grey Kelly Delgado (f)
 Men's 110 m hurdles winner:  Fanor Andrés Escobar Sinisterra
 Women's 100 m Hurdles winner:  Eliecith Palacios
 High Jump winners:  Yojan Camilo Chaverra (m) /  María Fernanda Murillo (f)
 Men's Long Jump winner:  Raul Mena Perdaza
 Women's Triple Jump winner:  Yosiris Urrutia
 Men's Discus Throw winner:  Chad Dimitri Wright
 Women's Hammer Throw winner:  Mayra Alexandra Gaviria Maldonado
 Shot Put winners:  Jhon Freddy Zea Chaverra (m) /  Anyela Marcela Rivas (f)
 May 3 & 4: Grand Prix Memorial Brigido Iriarte in  Caracas
 May 4: Grand Prix de Paraguay in  Asunción
 100 m winners:  Erik Cardoso (m) /  Hiebert Noreen Xenia Klassen (f)
 200 m winners:  Christopher Josue Ortiz Gonzalez (m) /  Ana Camila Pirelli (f)
 400 m winners:  Cleverson da Silva Pereira (m) (non GP) /  Érica Geni Barbosa Cavalheiro (f) (non GP)
 Men's 800 m winner:  Diego Facundo Alegre
 5000 m winners:  Derlis Ayala (m) /  María Leticia Añazco Colman (f)
 Women's 100 m Hurdles winner:  Ana Camila Pirelli
 400 m Hurdles winners:  Ivan Mathias Cubas Paredes (m) (non GP) /  Fátima Denisse Amarilla Gaona (f)
 Long Jump winners:  Noelia Giselle Vera Aguilar (f) (non GP)
 Women's Hammer Throw winner:  Gracielly Pereira Pinzan (non GP)
 Men's Javelin Throw winner:  Víctor Fatecha
 Women's Shot Put winner:  Ana Camila Pirelli
 May 5: Grand Prix Manuel Consiglieri in  Lima
 Men's 200 m winner:  Aldemir da Silva Júnior
 Men's 1,500 m winner:  Fabián Manrique
 Men's 5,000 m winner:  Jesús Yana Pineda
 Men's 110 m Hurdles winner:  Eduardo de Deus
 Women's 100 m Hurdles winner:  Génesis Romero
 Women's 3000 metres steeplechase winner:  Tatiane Raquel da Silva
 High Jump winners:  Eure Yáñez (m) /  Eliane Martins (f)
 Women's Triple Jump winner:  Silvana Daniela Segura Sánchez
 Women's 10 km Relay winner:  Mary Luz Andia
 May 10: Grand Prix Memorial Máximo Viloria in  Barquisimeto
 100 m winners:  David Vivas Larua (m) /  Génesis Romero (f)
 400 m winners:  Kelvis Jose Padrino Villasana (m) /  Odellanis Monjes (f)
 Women's Shut Put winner:  Ahymara Espinoza
 Women's 100 m Hurdles winner:  Génesis Romero

CONSUDATLE Major Events

 February 23: South American Cross Country Championships in 
 Winners:  José Luis Rojas (m) /  Silvia Patricia Ortiz (f)
 U20 winners:  Jagannatha Sánchez (m) /  Liz Campos (f)
 U18 winners:  Guido Bustamante (m) /  Jhenyfer Melchor (f)
 July 15 & 16: 2019 South American U20 Championships in Athletics in  Cali
 August 25: South American Half Marathon Championships in  Asunción
 October 27: South American Road Mile Championships in  Santiago

References

Notes

External links

 IAAF official website

 
Athletics
2019
2019 sport-related lists